

55001–55100 

|-bgcolor=#d6d6d6
| 55001 ||  || — || August 16, 2001 || Socorro || LINEAR || THM || align=right | 7.1 km || 
|-id=002 bgcolor=#d6d6d6
| 55002 ||  || — || August 16, 2001 || Socorro || LINEAR || KOR || align=right | 4.3 km || 
|-id=003 bgcolor=#d6d6d6
| 55003 ||  || — || August 16, 2001 || Socorro || LINEAR || EOS || align=right | 6.9 km || 
|-id=004 bgcolor=#d6d6d6
| 55004 ||  || — || August 16, 2001 || Socorro || LINEAR || KOR || align=right | 5.2 km || 
|-id=005 bgcolor=#fefefe
| 55005 ||  || — || August 16, 2001 || Socorro || LINEAR || — || align=right | 2.6 km || 
|-id=006 bgcolor=#d6d6d6
| 55006 ||  || — || August 16, 2001 || Socorro || LINEAR || — || align=right | 11 km || 
|-id=007 bgcolor=#d6d6d6
| 55007 ||  || — || August 16, 2001 || Socorro || LINEAR || HYG || align=right | 8.3 km || 
|-id=008 bgcolor=#d6d6d6
| 55008 ||  || — || August 16, 2001 || Socorro || LINEAR || — || align=right | 6.2 km || 
|-id=009 bgcolor=#E9E9E9
| 55009 ||  || — || August 16, 2001 || Socorro || LINEAR || — || align=right | 6.1 km || 
|-id=010 bgcolor=#fefefe
| 55010 ||  || — || August 16, 2001 || Socorro || LINEAR || NYS || align=right | 1.9 km || 
|-id=011 bgcolor=#d6d6d6
| 55011 ||  || — || August 16, 2001 || Socorro || LINEAR || KOR || align=right | 3.9 km || 
|-id=012 bgcolor=#d6d6d6
| 55012 ||  || — || August 16, 2001 || Socorro || LINEAR || EOS || align=right | 7.7 km || 
|-id=013 bgcolor=#E9E9E9
| 55013 ||  || — || August 16, 2001 || Socorro || LINEAR || — || align=right | 4.1 km || 
|-id=014 bgcolor=#E9E9E9
| 55014 ||  || — || August 16, 2001 || Socorro || LINEAR || EUN || align=right | 4.4 km || 
|-id=015 bgcolor=#E9E9E9
| 55015 ||  || — || August 16, 2001 || Socorro || LINEAR || — || align=right | 7.2 km || 
|-id=016 bgcolor=#E9E9E9
| 55016 ||  || — || August 17, 2001 || Socorro || LINEAR || — || align=right | 5.9 km || 
|-id=017 bgcolor=#d6d6d6
| 55017 ||  || — || August 17, 2001 || Socorro || LINEAR || — || align=right | 6.8 km || 
|-id=018 bgcolor=#E9E9E9
| 55018 ||  || — || August 16, 2001 || Palomar || NEAT || — || align=right | 4.1 km || 
|-id=019 bgcolor=#E9E9E9
| 55019 ||  || — || August 16, 2001 || Socorro || LINEAR || — || align=right | 3.1 km || 
|-id=020 bgcolor=#E9E9E9
| 55020 ||  || — || August 16, 2001 || Socorro || LINEAR || AGN || align=right | 3.0 km || 
|-id=021 bgcolor=#E9E9E9
| 55021 ||  || — || August 16, 2001 || Socorro || LINEAR || — || align=right | 4.4 km || 
|-id=022 bgcolor=#fefefe
| 55022 ||  || — || August 16, 2001 || Socorro || LINEAR || NYS || align=right | 2.0 km || 
|-id=023 bgcolor=#fefefe
| 55023 ||  || — || August 16, 2001 || Socorro || LINEAR || V || align=right | 1.9 km || 
|-id=024 bgcolor=#E9E9E9
| 55024 ||  || — || August 16, 2001 || Socorro || LINEAR || HEN || align=right | 2.8 km || 
|-id=025 bgcolor=#d6d6d6
| 55025 ||  || — || August 16, 2001 || Socorro || LINEAR || KOR || align=right | 3.4 km || 
|-id=026 bgcolor=#fefefe
| 55026 ||  || — || August 16, 2001 || Socorro || LINEAR || — || align=right | 4.3 km || 
|-id=027 bgcolor=#d6d6d6
| 55027 ||  || — || August 16, 2001 || Socorro || LINEAR || THM || align=right | 9.4 km || 
|-id=028 bgcolor=#d6d6d6
| 55028 ||  || — || August 16, 2001 || Socorro || LINEAR || — || align=right | 5.8 km || 
|-id=029 bgcolor=#d6d6d6
| 55029 ||  || — || August 16, 2001 || Socorro || LINEAR || — || align=right | 3.5 km || 
|-id=030 bgcolor=#d6d6d6
| 55030 ||  || — || August 16, 2001 || Socorro || LINEAR || — || align=right | 4.8 km || 
|-id=031 bgcolor=#fefefe
| 55031 ||  || — || August 16, 2001 || Socorro || LINEAR || NYS || align=right | 1.9 km || 
|-id=032 bgcolor=#fefefe
| 55032 ||  || — || August 16, 2001 || Socorro || LINEAR || — || align=right | 3.5 km || 
|-id=033 bgcolor=#E9E9E9
| 55033 ||  || — || August 16, 2001 || Socorro || LINEAR || — || align=right | 3.7 km || 
|-id=034 bgcolor=#fefefe
| 55034 ||  || — || August 16, 2001 || Socorro || LINEAR || NYS || align=right | 1.9 km || 
|-id=035 bgcolor=#d6d6d6
| 55035 ||  || — || August 16, 2001 || Socorro || LINEAR || EOS || align=right | 5.8 km || 
|-id=036 bgcolor=#E9E9E9
| 55036 ||  || — || August 16, 2001 || Socorro || LINEAR || MIS || align=right | 4.8 km || 
|-id=037 bgcolor=#d6d6d6
| 55037 ||  || — || August 16, 2001 || Socorro || LINEAR || — || align=right | 8.7 km || 
|-id=038 bgcolor=#fefefe
| 55038 ||  || — || August 16, 2001 || Socorro || LINEAR || V || align=right | 2.2 km || 
|-id=039 bgcolor=#E9E9E9
| 55039 ||  || — || August 16, 2001 || Socorro || LINEAR || MAR || align=right | 2.9 km || 
|-id=040 bgcolor=#fefefe
| 55040 ||  || — || August 16, 2001 || Socorro || LINEAR || — || align=right | 2.4 km || 
|-id=041 bgcolor=#fefefe
| 55041 ||  || — || August 16, 2001 || Socorro || LINEAR || — || align=right | 2.7 km || 
|-id=042 bgcolor=#E9E9E9
| 55042 ||  || — || August 17, 2001 || Socorro || LINEAR || — || align=right | 3.9 km || 
|-id=043 bgcolor=#FA8072
| 55043 ||  || — || August 18, 2001 || Socorro || LINEAR || — || align=right | 3.2 km || 
|-id=044 bgcolor=#E9E9E9
| 55044 ||  || — || August 18, 2001 || Socorro || LINEAR || HEN || align=right | 2.1 km || 
|-id=045 bgcolor=#E9E9E9
| 55045 ||  || — || August 16, 2001 || Socorro || LINEAR || — || align=right | 2.9 km || 
|-id=046 bgcolor=#E9E9E9
| 55046 ||  || — || August 16, 2001 || Socorro || LINEAR || — || align=right | 3.9 km || 
|-id=047 bgcolor=#d6d6d6
| 55047 ||  || — || August 17, 2001 || Socorro || LINEAR || — || align=right | 5.7 km || 
|-id=048 bgcolor=#fefefe
| 55048 ||  || — || August 17, 2001 || Socorro || LINEAR || — || align=right | 2.0 km || 
|-id=049 bgcolor=#E9E9E9
| 55049 ||  || — || August 18, 2001 || Socorro || LINEAR || — || align=right | 5.6 km || 
|-id=050 bgcolor=#fefefe
| 55050 ||  || — || August 19, 2001 || Socorro || LINEAR || — || align=right | 1.6 km || 
|-id=051 bgcolor=#E9E9E9
| 55051 ||  || — || August 20, 2001 || Oakley || C. Wolfe || — || align=right | 4.9 km || 
|-id=052 bgcolor=#d6d6d6
| 55052 ||  || — || August 20, 2001 || Oakley || C. Wolfe || — || align=right | 6.5 km || 
|-id=053 bgcolor=#E9E9E9
| 55053 ||  || — || August 20, 2001 || Oakley || C. Wolfe || — || align=right | 3.5 km || 
|-id=054 bgcolor=#fefefe
| 55054 ||  || — || August 17, 2001 || Socorro || LINEAR || — || align=right | 1.7 km || 
|-id=055 bgcolor=#E9E9E9
| 55055 ||  || — || August 17, 2001 || Socorro || LINEAR || MRX || align=right | 3.2 km || 
|-id=056 bgcolor=#E9E9E9
| 55056 ||  || — || August 17, 2001 || Socorro || LINEAR || MAR || align=right | 3.3 km || 
|-id=057 bgcolor=#d6d6d6
| 55057 ||  || — || August 17, 2001 || Socorro || LINEAR || — || align=right | 10 km || 
|-id=058 bgcolor=#fefefe
| 55058 ||  || — || August 19, 2001 || Socorro || LINEAR || PHO || align=right | 2.8 km || 
|-id=059 bgcolor=#d6d6d6
| 55059 ||  || — || August 19, 2001 || Socorro || LINEAR || ALA || align=right | 14 km || 
|-id=060 bgcolor=#C2FFFF
| 55060 ||  || — || August 19, 2001 || Socorro || LINEAR || L5 || align=right | 29 km || 
|-id=061 bgcolor=#E9E9E9
| 55061 ||  || — || August 16, 2001 || Socorro || LINEAR || — || align=right | 3.7 km || 
|-id=062 bgcolor=#E9E9E9
| 55062 ||  || — || August 16, 2001 || Socorro || LINEAR || — || align=right | 5.0 km || 
|-id=063 bgcolor=#E9E9E9
| 55063 ||  || — || August 16, 2001 || Socorro || LINEAR || EUN || align=right | 4.8 km || 
|-id=064 bgcolor=#d6d6d6
| 55064 ||  || — || August 17, 2001 || Socorro || LINEAR || EOS || align=right | 5.4 km || 
|-id=065 bgcolor=#fefefe
| 55065 ||  || — || August 17, 2001 || Socorro || LINEAR || — || align=right | 2.7 km || 
|-id=066 bgcolor=#E9E9E9
| 55066 ||  || — || August 17, 2001 || Socorro || LINEAR || — || align=right | 4.4 km || 
|-id=067 bgcolor=#E9E9E9
| 55067 ||  || — || August 17, 2001 || Socorro || LINEAR || — || align=right | 3.2 km || 
|-id=068 bgcolor=#d6d6d6
| 55068 ||  || — || August 17, 2001 || Socorro || LINEAR || — || align=right | 11 km || 
|-id=069 bgcolor=#E9E9E9
| 55069 ||  || — || August 20, 2001 || Socorro || LINEAR || — || align=right | 3.6 km || 
|-id=070 bgcolor=#E9E9E9
| 55070 ||  || — || August 22, 2001 || Desert Eagle || W. K. Y. Yeung || — || align=right | 4.8 km || 
|-id=071 bgcolor=#d6d6d6
| 55071 ||  || — || August 18, 2001 || Palomar || NEAT || — || align=right | 6.0 km || 
|-id=072 bgcolor=#d6d6d6
| 55072 ||  || — || August 16, 2001 || Palomar || NEAT || — || align=right | 6.8 km || 
|-id=073 bgcolor=#E9E9E9
| 55073 ||  || — || August 22, 2001 || Socorro || LINEAR || — || align=right | 4.6 km || 
|-id=074 bgcolor=#d6d6d6
| 55074 ||  || — || August 22, 2001 || Socorro || LINEAR || — || align=right | 8.1 km || 
|-id=075 bgcolor=#fefefe
| 55075 ||  || — || August 16, 2001 || Socorro || LINEAR || V || align=right | 2.2 km || 
|-id=076 bgcolor=#E9E9E9
| 55076 ||  || — || August 16, 2001 || Socorro || LINEAR || EUN || align=right | 4.3 km || 
|-id=077 bgcolor=#d6d6d6
| 55077 ||  || — || August 19, 2001 || Socorro || LINEAR || — || align=right | 4.9 km || 
|-id=078 bgcolor=#E9E9E9
| 55078 ||  || — || August 20, 2001 || Palomar || NEAT || EUN || align=right | 3.8 km || 
|-id=079 bgcolor=#fefefe
| 55079 ||  || — || August 19, 2001 || Socorro || LINEAR || FLO || align=right | 1.9 km || 
|-id=080 bgcolor=#E9E9E9
| 55080 ||  || — || August 21, 2001 || Socorro || LINEAR || — || align=right | 4.4 km || 
|-id=081 bgcolor=#E9E9E9
| 55081 ||  || — || August 21, 2001 || Palomar || NEAT || — || align=right | 2.6 km || 
|-id=082 bgcolor=#fefefe
| 55082 Xlendi ||  ||  || August 25, 2001 || Kleť || J. Tichá, M. Tichý || — || align=right | 2.4 km || 
|-id=083 bgcolor=#d6d6d6
| 55083 ||  || — || August 24, 2001 || Ondřejov || P. Kušnirák, P. Pravec || TEL || align=right | 5.7 km || 
|-id=084 bgcolor=#d6d6d6
| 55084 ||  || — || August 17, 2001 || Socorro || LINEAR || EOS || align=right | 5.0 km || 
|-id=085 bgcolor=#fefefe
| 55085 ||  || — || August 17, 2001 || Socorro || LINEAR || V || align=right | 2.2 km || 
|-id=086 bgcolor=#E9E9E9
| 55086 ||  || — || August 17, 2001 || Socorro || LINEAR || RAF || align=right | 3.4 km || 
|-id=087 bgcolor=#fefefe
| 55087 ||  || — || August 18, 2001 || Socorro || LINEAR || — || align=right | 3.5 km || 
|-id=088 bgcolor=#E9E9E9
| 55088 ||  || — || August 19, 2001 || Socorro || LINEAR || — || align=right | 5.7 km || 
|-id=089 bgcolor=#E9E9E9
| 55089 ||  || — || August 19, 2001 || Socorro || LINEAR || — || align=right | 3.4 km || 
|-id=090 bgcolor=#fefefe
| 55090 ||  || — || August 19, 2001 || Socorro || LINEAR || V || align=right | 1.7 km || 
|-id=091 bgcolor=#d6d6d6
| 55091 ||  || — || August 19, 2001 || Socorro || LINEAR || — || align=right | 5.7 km || 
|-id=092 bgcolor=#fefefe
| 55092 ||  || — || August 19, 2001 || Socorro || LINEAR || — || align=right | 1.6 km || 
|-id=093 bgcolor=#fefefe
| 55093 ||  || — || August 19, 2001 || Socorro || LINEAR || — || align=right | 2.3 km || 
|-id=094 bgcolor=#E9E9E9
| 55094 ||  || — || August 20, 2001 || Socorro || LINEAR || ADE || align=right | 5.3 km || 
|-id=095 bgcolor=#d6d6d6
| 55095 ||  || — || August 20, 2001 || Socorro || LINEAR || — || align=right | 4.7 km || 
|-id=096 bgcolor=#fefefe
| 55096 ||  || — || August 20, 2001 || Socorro || LINEAR || V || align=right | 1.8 km || 
|-id=097 bgcolor=#d6d6d6
| 55097 ||  || — || August 20, 2001 || Socorro || LINEAR || EOS || align=right | 6.0 km || 
|-id=098 bgcolor=#d6d6d6
| 55098 ||  || — || August 21, 2001 || Socorro || LINEAR || — || align=right | 12 km || 
|-id=099 bgcolor=#d6d6d6
| 55099 ||  || — || August 22, 2001 || Socorro || LINEAR || — || align=right | 12 km || 
|-id=100 bgcolor=#d6d6d6
| 55100 ||  || — || August 22, 2001 || Socorro || LINEAR || — || align=right | 11 km || 
|}

55101–55200 

|-bgcolor=#E9E9E9
| 55101 ||  || — || August 22, 2001 || Socorro || LINEAR || JUN || align=right | 2.8 km || 
|-id=102 bgcolor=#fefefe
| 55102 ||  || — || August 22, 2001 || Socorro || LINEAR || V || align=right | 3.1 km || 
|-id=103 bgcolor=#fefefe
| 55103 ||  || — || August 22, 2001 || Socorro || LINEAR || V || align=right | 4.3 km || 
|-id=104 bgcolor=#E9E9E9
| 55104 ||  || — || August 22, 2001 || Socorro || LINEAR || — || align=right | 9.1 km || 
|-id=105 bgcolor=#fefefe
| 55105 ||  || — || August 22, 2001 || Socorro || LINEAR || — || align=right | 4.5 km || 
|-id=106 bgcolor=#d6d6d6
| 55106 ||  || — || August 24, 2001 || Socorro || LINEAR || KOR || align=right | 3.6 km || 
|-id=107 bgcolor=#d6d6d6
| 55107 ||  || — || August 24, 2001 || Socorro || LINEAR || THM || align=right | 7.8 km || 
|-id=108 bgcolor=#d6d6d6
| 55108 Beamueller ||  ||  || August 24, 2001 || Goodricke-Pigott || R. A. Tucker || EOS || align=right | 6.6 km || 
|-id=109 bgcolor=#d6d6d6
| 55109 ||  || — || August 24, 2001 || Kitt Peak || Spacewatch || — || align=right | 6.8 km || 
|-id=110 bgcolor=#d6d6d6
| 55110 ||  || — || August 25, 2001 || Kitt Peak || Spacewatch || — || align=right | 4.7 km || 
|-id=111 bgcolor=#E9E9E9
| 55111 ||  || — || August 26, 2001 || Socorro || LINEAR || — || align=right | 12 km || 
|-id=112 bgcolor=#d6d6d6
| 55112 Mariangela ||  ||  || August 28, 2001 || Piera || J. Guarro i Fló || EOS || align=right | 5.6 km || 
|-id=113 bgcolor=#d6d6d6
| 55113 ||  || — || August 23, 2001 || Anderson Mesa || LONEOS || KOR || align=right | 3.1 km || 
|-id=114 bgcolor=#d6d6d6
| 55114 ||  || — || August 23, 2001 || Anderson Mesa || LONEOS || KOR || align=right | 3.7 km || 
|-id=115 bgcolor=#d6d6d6
| 55115 ||  || — || August 23, 2001 || Anderson Mesa || LONEOS || — || align=right | 4.8 km || 
|-id=116 bgcolor=#E9E9E9
| 55116 ||  || — || August 24, 2001 || Haleakala || NEAT || — || align=right | 5.5 km || 
|-id=117 bgcolor=#E9E9E9
| 55117 ||  || — || August 24, 2001 || Haleakala || NEAT || — || align=right | 2.4 km || 
|-id=118 bgcolor=#fefefe
| 55118 ||  || — || August 24, 2001 || Haleakala || NEAT || — || align=right | 3.8 km || 
|-id=119 bgcolor=#E9E9E9
| 55119 ||  || — || August 24, 2001 || Haleakala || NEAT || — || align=right | 5.9 km || 
|-id=120 bgcolor=#d6d6d6
| 55120 ||  || — || August 25, 2001 || Palomar || NEAT || EOS || align=right | 5.0 km || 
|-id=121 bgcolor=#fefefe
| 55121 ||  || — || August 26, 2001 || Haleakala || NEAT || V || align=right | 1.6 km || 
|-id=122 bgcolor=#E9E9E9
| 55122 ||  || — || August 22, 2001 || Socorro || LINEAR || HOF || align=right | 7.7 km || 
|-id=123 bgcolor=#d6d6d6
| 55123 ||  || — || August 23, 2001 || Socorro || LINEAR || — || align=right | 8.2 km || 
|-id=124 bgcolor=#d6d6d6
| 55124 ||  || — || August 24, 2001 || Socorro || LINEAR || KAR || align=right | 2.7 km || 
|-id=125 bgcolor=#E9E9E9
| 55125 ||  || — || August 25, 2001 || Socorro || LINEAR || — || align=right | 3.2 km || 
|-id=126 bgcolor=#E9E9E9
| 55126 ||  || — || August 27, 2001 || Socorro || LINEAR || — || align=right | 2.5 km || 
|-id=127 bgcolor=#E9E9E9
| 55127 ||  || — || August 21, 2001 || Kitt Peak || Spacewatch || — || align=right | 4.8 km || 
|-id=128 bgcolor=#fefefe
| 55128 ||  || — || August 21, 2001 || Haleakala || NEAT || — || align=right | 4.9 km || 
|-id=129 bgcolor=#E9E9E9
| 55129 ||  || — || August 26, 2001 || Palomar || NEAT || — || align=right | 3.9 km || 
|-id=130 bgcolor=#E9E9E9
| 55130 ||  || — || August 25, 2001 || Palomar || NEAT || — || align=right | 4.8 km || 
|-id=131 bgcolor=#E9E9E9
| 55131 ||  || — || August 29, 2001 || Palomar || NEAT || — || align=right | 2.9 km || 
|-id=132 bgcolor=#d6d6d6
| 55132 ||  || — || August 30, 2001 || Palomar || NEAT || EOS || align=right | 5.8 km || 
|-id=133 bgcolor=#d6d6d6
| 55133 ||  || — || August 29, 2001 || Palomar || NEAT || — || align=right | 5.5 km || 
|-id=134 bgcolor=#d6d6d6
| 55134 ||  || — || August 25, 2001 || Bergisch Gladbach || W. Bickel || THM || align=right | 8.3 km || 
|-id=135 bgcolor=#d6d6d6
| 55135 ||  || — || August 28, 2001 || Bergisch Gladbach || W. Bickel || EOS || align=right | 3.6 km || 
|-id=136 bgcolor=#fefefe
| 55136 ||  || — || August 21, 2001 || Haleakala || NEAT || — || align=right | 1.5 km || 
|-id=137 bgcolor=#E9E9E9
| 55137 ||  || — || August 21, 2001 || Socorro || LINEAR || — || align=right | 6.5 km || 
|-id=138 bgcolor=#E9E9E9
| 55138 ||  || — || August 21, 2001 || Socorro || LINEAR || — || align=right | 2.5 km || 
|-id=139 bgcolor=#E9E9E9
| 55139 ||  || — || August 22, 2001 || Socorro || LINEAR || — || align=right | 4.5 km || 
|-id=140 bgcolor=#d6d6d6
| 55140 ||  || — || August 22, 2001 || Socorro || LINEAR || — || align=right | 6.1 km || 
|-id=141 bgcolor=#E9E9E9
| 55141 ||  || — || August 22, 2001 || Socorro || LINEAR || — || align=right | 3.7 km || 
|-id=142 bgcolor=#E9E9E9
| 55142 ||  || — || August 22, 2001 || Socorro || LINEAR || — || align=right | 5.2 km || 
|-id=143 bgcolor=#fefefe
| 55143 ||  || — || August 22, 2001 || Socorro || LINEAR || PHO || align=right | 4.2 km || 
|-id=144 bgcolor=#d6d6d6
| 55144 ||  || — || August 22, 2001 || Socorro || LINEAR || THM || align=right | 7.1 km || 
|-id=145 bgcolor=#fefefe
| 55145 ||  || — || August 22, 2001 || Socorro || LINEAR || NYS || align=right | 4.5 km || 
|-id=146 bgcolor=#d6d6d6
| 55146 ||  || — || August 22, 2001 || Socorro || LINEAR || — || align=right | 3.9 km || 
|-id=147 bgcolor=#E9E9E9
| 55147 ||  || — || August 22, 2001 || Socorro || LINEAR || — || align=right | 6.5 km || 
|-id=148 bgcolor=#E9E9E9
| 55148 ||  || — || August 22, 2001 || Palomar || NEAT || — || align=right | 4.7 km || 
|-id=149 bgcolor=#E9E9E9
| 55149 ||  || — || August 23, 2001 || Kitt Peak || Spacewatch || — || align=right | 3.2 km || 
|-id=150 bgcolor=#d6d6d6
| 55150 ||  || — || August 23, 2001 || Anderson Mesa || LONEOS || EOS || align=right | 3.8 km || 
|-id=151 bgcolor=#E9E9E9
| 55151 ||  || — || August 23, 2001 || Anderson Mesa || LONEOS || — || align=right | 2.6 km || 
|-id=152 bgcolor=#d6d6d6
| 55152 ||  || — || August 23, 2001 || Anderson Mesa || LONEOS || THM || align=right | 6.4 km || 
|-id=153 bgcolor=#E9E9E9
| 55153 ||  || — || August 23, 2001 || Anderson Mesa || LONEOS || PAD || align=right | 4.5 km || 
|-id=154 bgcolor=#E9E9E9
| 55154 ||  || — || August 23, 2001 || Socorro || LINEAR || EUN || align=right | 4.3 km || 
|-id=155 bgcolor=#E9E9E9
| 55155 ||  || — || August 24, 2001 || Anderson Mesa || LONEOS || — || align=right | 3.4 km || 
|-id=156 bgcolor=#E9E9E9
| 55156 ||  || — || August 24, 2001 || Anderson Mesa || LONEOS || — || align=right | 3.8 km || 
|-id=157 bgcolor=#fefefe
| 55157 ||  || — || August 24, 2001 || Anderson Mesa || LONEOS || — || align=right | 2.6 km || 
|-id=158 bgcolor=#d6d6d6
| 55158 ||  || — || August 24, 2001 || Anderson Mesa || LONEOS || — || align=right | 7.2 km || 
|-id=159 bgcolor=#fefefe
| 55159 ||  || — || August 24, 2001 || Socorro || LINEAR || — || align=right | 2.3 km || 
|-id=160 bgcolor=#fefefe
| 55160 ||  || — || August 24, 2001 || Socorro || LINEAR || NYSfast? || align=right | 1.5 km || 
|-id=161 bgcolor=#d6d6d6
| 55161 ||  || — || August 24, 2001 || Socorro || LINEAR || — || align=right | 7.5 km || 
|-id=162 bgcolor=#E9E9E9
| 55162 ||  || — || August 24, 2001 || Socorro || LINEAR || — || align=right | 3.7 km || 
|-id=163 bgcolor=#d6d6d6
| 55163 ||  || — || August 24, 2001 || Socorro || LINEAR || — || align=right | 6.2 km || 
|-id=164 bgcolor=#E9E9E9
| 55164 ||  || — || August 24, 2001 || Socorro || LINEAR || — || align=right | 3.4 km || 
|-id=165 bgcolor=#E9E9E9
| 55165 ||  || — || August 24, 2001 || Socorro || LINEAR || — || align=right | 4.2 km || 
|-id=166 bgcolor=#E9E9E9
| 55166 ||  || — || August 24, 2001 || Socorro || LINEAR || — || align=right | 4.8 km || 
|-id=167 bgcolor=#d6d6d6
| 55167 ||  || — || August 24, 2001 || Socorro || LINEAR || — || align=right | 7.8 km || 
|-id=168 bgcolor=#d6d6d6
| 55168 ||  || — || August 24, 2001 || Haleakala || NEAT || — || align=right | 7.8 km || 
|-id=169 bgcolor=#E9E9E9
| 55169 ||  || — || August 25, 2001 || Socorro || LINEAR || — || align=right | 2.4 km || 
|-id=170 bgcolor=#d6d6d6
| 55170 ||  || — || August 25, 2001 || Socorro || LINEAR || EOS || align=right | 4.6 km || 
|-id=171 bgcolor=#E9E9E9
| 55171 ||  || — || August 25, 2001 || Socorro || LINEAR || — || align=right | 3.8 km || 
|-id=172 bgcolor=#E9E9E9
| 55172 ||  || — || August 25, 2001 || Socorro || LINEAR || MAR || align=right | 3.9 km || 
|-id=173 bgcolor=#E9E9E9
| 55173 ||  || — || August 25, 2001 || Socorro || LINEAR || — || align=right | 3.0 km || 
|-id=174 bgcolor=#fefefe
| 55174 ||  || — || August 25, 2001 || Socorro || LINEAR || V || align=right | 2.2 km || 
|-id=175 bgcolor=#E9E9E9
| 55175 ||  || — || August 25, 2001 || Socorro || LINEAR || — || align=right | 3.5 km || 
|-id=176 bgcolor=#E9E9E9
| 55176 ||  || — || August 25, 2001 || Socorro || LINEAR || — || align=right | 3.2 km || 
|-id=177 bgcolor=#d6d6d6
| 55177 ||  || — || August 25, 2001 || Anderson Mesa || LONEOS || KOR || align=right | 4.0 km || 
|-id=178 bgcolor=#E9E9E9
| 55178 ||  || — || August 26, 2001 || Socorro || LINEAR || — || align=right | 4.2 km || 
|-id=179 bgcolor=#d6d6d6
| 55179 ||  || — || August 19, 2001 || Socorro || LINEAR || — || align=right | 11 km || 
|-id=180 bgcolor=#fefefe
| 55180 ||  || — || August 19, 2001 || Socorro || LINEAR || — || align=right | 4.4 km || 
|-id=181 bgcolor=#E9E9E9
| 55181 ||  || — || August 19, 2001 || Socorro || LINEAR || JUN || align=right | 9.1 km || 
|-id=182 bgcolor=#E9E9E9
| 55182 ||  || — || August 19, 2001 || Anderson Mesa || LONEOS || HNS || align=right | 4.6 km || 
|-id=183 bgcolor=#d6d6d6
| 55183 ||  || — || August 18, 2001 || Palomar || NEAT || EOS || align=right | 9.2 km || 
|-id=184 bgcolor=#d6d6d6
| 55184 ||  || — || August 17, 2001 || Socorro || LINEAR || — || align=right | 8.1 km || 
|-id=185 bgcolor=#d6d6d6
| 55185 ||  || — || August 17, 2001 || Socorro || LINEAR || HYG || align=right | 6.9 km || 
|-id=186 bgcolor=#d6d6d6
| 55186 ||  || — || August 16, 2001 || Socorro || LINEAR || — || align=right | 4.8 km || 
|-id=187 bgcolor=#E9E9E9
| 55187 ||  || — || August 16, 2001 || Socorro || LINEAR || — || align=right | 3.3 km || 
|-id=188 bgcolor=#d6d6d6
| 55188 ||  || — || August 16, 2001 || Socorro || LINEAR || THM || align=right | 9.4 km || 
|-id=189 bgcolor=#E9E9E9
| 55189 ||  || — || August 24, 2001 || Socorro || LINEAR || MIT || align=right | 5.2 km || 
|-id=190 bgcolor=#fefefe
| 55190 ||  || — || August 24, 2001 || Socorro || LINEAR || — || align=right | 2.5 km || 
|-id=191 bgcolor=#E9E9E9
| 55191 ||  || — || August 24, 2001 || Anderson Mesa || LONEOS || EUN || align=right | 4.8 km || 
|-id=192 bgcolor=#d6d6d6
| 55192 ||  || — || September 8, 2001 || Prescott || P. G. Comba || 7:4 || align=right | 3.9 km || 
|-id=193 bgcolor=#E9E9E9
| 55193 ||  || — || September 8, 2001 || Socorro || LINEAR || — || align=right | 5.2 km || 
|-id=194 bgcolor=#d6d6d6
| 55194 ||  || — || September 10, 2001 || Desert Eagle || W. K. Y. Yeung || — || align=right | 5.3 km || 
|-id=195 bgcolor=#fefefe
| 55195 ||  || — || September 9, 2001 || Socorro || LINEAR || V || align=right | 2.2 km || 
|-id=196 bgcolor=#d6d6d6
| 55196 Marchini ||  ||  || September 11, 2001 || San Marcello || A. Boattini, L. Tesi || 3:2 || align=right | 11 km || 
|-id=197 bgcolor=#E9E9E9
| 55197 ||  || — || September 11, 2001 || Desert Eagle || W. K. Y. Yeung || AST || align=right | 6.5 km || 
|-id=198 bgcolor=#fefefe
| 55198 ||  || — || September 7, 2001 || Socorro || LINEAR || ERI || align=right | 5.7 km || 
|-id=199 bgcolor=#fefefe
| 55199 ||  || — || September 7, 2001 || Socorro || LINEAR || MAS || align=right | 1.7 km || 
|-id=200 bgcolor=#d6d6d6
| 55200 ||  || — || September 7, 2001 || Socorro || LINEAR || — || align=right | 6.8 km || 
|}

55201–55300 

|-bgcolor=#fefefe
| 55201 ||  || — || September 7, 2001 || Socorro || LINEAR || NYS || align=right | 1.4 km || 
|-id=202 bgcolor=#d6d6d6
| 55202 ||  || — || September 7, 2001 || Socorro || LINEAR || — || align=right | 5.2 km || 
|-id=203 bgcolor=#d6d6d6
| 55203 ||  || — || September 7, 2001 || Socorro || LINEAR || THM || align=right | 7.3 km || 
|-id=204 bgcolor=#d6d6d6
| 55204 ||  || — || September 7, 2001 || Socorro || LINEAR || — || align=right | 6.3 km || 
|-id=205 bgcolor=#d6d6d6
| 55205 ||  || — || September 7, 2001 || Socorro || LINEAR || — || align=right | 9.8 km || 
|-id=206 bgcolor=#d6d6d6
| 55206 ||  || — || September 8, 2001 || Socorro || LINEAR || CHA || align=right | 5.0 km || 
|-id=207 bgcolor=#E9E9E9
| 55207 ||  || — || September 8, 2001 || Socorro || LINEAR || — || align=right | 5.3 km || 
|-id=208 bgcolor=#E9E9E9
| 55208 ||  || — || September 8, 2001 || Socorro || LINEAR || — || align=right | 3.1 km || 
|-id=209 bgcolor=#fefefe
| 55209 ||  || — || September 8, 2001 || Socorro || LINEAR || — || align=right | 2.0 km || 
|-id=210 bgcolor=#E9E9E9
| 55210 ||  || — || September 8, 2001 || Socorro || LINEAR || — || align=right | 3.4 km || 
|-id=211 bgcolor=#d6d6d6
| 55211 ||  || — || September 13, 2001 || Ametlla de Mar || J. Nomen || HYG || align=right | 8.1 km || 
|-id=212 bgcolor=#d6d6d6
| 55212 Yukitoayatsuji ||  ||  || September 12, 2001 || Goodricke-Pigott || R. A. Tucker || — || align=right | 4.8 km || 
|-id=213 bgcolor=#E9E9E9
| 55213 ||  || — || September 11, 2001 || Socorro || LINEAR || BRU || align=right | 10 km || 
|-id=214 bgcolor=#fefefe
| 55214 ||  || — || September 9, 2001 || Socorro || LINEAR || — || align=right | 2.2 km || 
|-id=215 bgcolor=#E9E9E9
| 55215 ||  || — || September 12, 2001 || Socorro || LINEAR || — || align=right | 2.8 km || 
|-id=216 bgcolor=#E9E9E9
| 55216 ||  || — || September 12, 2001 || Socorro || LINEAR || — || align=right | 4.2 km || 
|-id=217 bgcolor=#d6d6d6
| 55217 ||  || — || September 12, 2001 || Socorro || LINEAR || — || align=right | 7.3 km || 
|-id=218 bgcolor=#d6d6d6
| 55218 ||  || — || September 12, 2001 || Socorro || LINEAR || — || align=right | 10 km || 
|-id=219 bgcolor=#d6d6d6
| 55219 ||  || — || September 12, 2001 || Socorro || LINEAR || THM || align=right | 5.2 km || 
|-id=220 bgcolor=#d6d6d6
| 55220 ||  || — || September 12, 2001 || Socorro || LINEAR || EOS || align=right | 4.6 km || 
|-id=221 bgcolor=#d6d6d6
| 55221 Nancynoblitt ||  ||  || September 11, 2001 || Oakley || C. Wolfe || — || align=right | 11 km || 
|-id=222 bgcolor=#d6d6d6
| 55222 Makotoshinkai ||  ||  || September 12, 2001 || Goodricke-Pigott || R. A. Tucker || — || align=right | 7.3 km || 
|-id=223 bgcolor=#E9E9E9
| 55223 Akiraifukube ||  ||  || September 12, 2001 || Goodricke-Pigott || R. A. Tucker || — || align=right | 3.1 km || 
|-id=224 bgcolor=#E9E9E9
| 55224 ||  || — || September 10, 2001 || Socorro || LINEAR || — || align=right | 3.0 km || 
|-id=225 bgcolor=#d6d6d6
| 55225 ||  || — || September 10, 2001 || Socorro || LINEAR || HYG || align=right | 6.9 km || 
|-id=226 bgcolor=#d6d6d6
| 55226 ||  || — || September 10, 2001 || Socorro || LINEAR || HYG || align=right | 14 km || 
|-id=227 bgcolor=#E9E9E9
| 55227 ||  || — || September 10, 2001 || Socorro || LINEAR || — || align=right | 4.0 km || 
|-id=228 bgcolor=#d6d6d6
| 55228 ||  || — || September 10, 2001 || Socorro || LINEAR || KOR || align=right | 4.1 km || 
|-id=229 bgcolor=#d6d6d6
| 55229 ||  || — || September 10, 2001 || Socorro || LINEAR || — || align=right | 4.2 km || 
|-id=230 bgcolor=#fefefe
| 55230 ||  || — || September 10, 2001 || Socorro || LINEAR || V || align=right | 1.5 km || 
|-id=231 bgcolor=#fefefe
| 55231 ||  || — || September 10, 2001 || Socorro || LINEAR || — || align=right | 2.6 km || 
|-id=232 bgcolor=#E9E9E9
| 55232 ||  || — || September 10, 2001 || Socorro || LINEAR || — || align=right | 7.4 km || 
|-id=233 bgcolor=#fefefe
| 55233 ||  || — || September 10, 2001 || Socorro || LINEAR || — || align=right | 5.1 km || 
|-id=234 bgcolor=#d6d6d6
| 55234 ||  || — || September 10, 2001 || Socorro || LINEAR || — || align=right | 14 km || 
|-id=235 bgcolor=#E9E9E9
| 55235 ||  || — || September 9, 2001 || Haleakala || NEAT || — || align=right | 2.5 km || 
|-id=236 bgcolor=#E9E9E9
| 55236 ||  || — || September 13, 2001 || Palomar || NEAT || — || align=right | 6.4 km || 
|-id=237 bgcolor=#E9E9E9
| 55237 ||  || — || September 14, 2001 || Palomar || NEAT || — || align=right | 2.6 km || 
|-id=238 bgcolor=#fefefe
| 55238 ||  || — || September 11, 2001 || Anderson Mesa || LONEOS || NYS || align=right | 1.9 km || 
|-id=239 bgcolor=#d6d6d6
| 55239 ||  || — || September 11, 2001 || Anderson Mesa || LONEOS || HYG || align=right | 6.3 km || 
|-id=240 bgcolor=#d6d6d6
| 55240 ||  || — || September 11, 2001 || Anderson Mesa || LONEOS || EOS || align=right | 4.7 km || 
|-id=241 bgcolor=#E9E9E9
| 55241 ||  || — || September 11, 2001 || Anderson Mesa || LONEOS || — || align=right | 2.3 km || 
|-id=242 bgcolor=#d6d6d6
| 55242 ||  || — || September 11, 2001 || Anderson Mesa || LONEOS || — || align=right | 6.9 km || 
|-id=243 bgcolor=#E9E9E9
| 55243 ||  || — || September 11, 2001 || Anderson Mesa || LONEOS || VIB || align=right | 5.5 km || 
|-id=244 bgcolor=#fefefe
| 55244 ||  || — || September 11, 2001 || Anderson Mesa || LONEOS || NYS || align=right | 2.9 km || 
|-id=245 bgcolor=#d6d6d6
| 55245 ||  || — || September 11, 2001 || Anderson Mesa || LONEOS || — || align=right | 4.3 km || 
|-id=246 bgcolor=#d6d6d6
| 55246 ||  || — || September 11, 2001 || Anderson Mesa || LONEOS || — || align=right | 5.8 km || 
|-id=247 bgcolor=#d6d6d6
| 55247 ||  || — || September 11, 2001 || Anderson Mesa || LONEOS || 628 || align=right | 5.1 km || 
|-id=248 bgcolor=#E9E9E9
| 55248 ||  || — || September 12, 2001 || Socorro || LINEAR || — || align=right | 5.6 km || 
|-id=249 bgcolor=#fefefe
| 55249 ||  || — || September 12, 2001 || Socorro || LINEAR || V || align=right | 1.8 km || 
|-id=250 bgcolor=#d6d6d6
| 55250 ||  || — || September 12, 2001 || Socorro || LINEAR || KOR || align=right | 3.4 km || 
|-id=251 bgcolor=#d6d6d6
| 55251 ||  || — || September 12, 2001 || Socorro || LINEAR || KOR || align=right | 3.0 km || 
|-id=252 bgcolor=#d6d6d6
| 55252 ||  || — || September 12, 2001 || Socorro || LINEAR || KOR || align=right | 3.2 km || 
|-id=253 bgcolor=#d6d6d6
| 55253 ||  || — || September 12, 2001 || Socorro || LINEAR || KOR || align=right | 4.1 km || 
|-id=254 bgcolor=#d6d6d6
| 55254 ||  || — || September 12, 2001 || Socorro || LINEAR || THM || align=right | 6.4 km || 
|-id=255 bgcolor=#d6d6d6
| 55255 ||  || — || September 12, 2001 || Socorro || LINEAR || — || align=right | 6.0 km || 
|-id=256 bgcolor=#d6d6d6
| 55256 ||  || — || September 12, 2001 || Socorro || LINEAR || HYG || align=right | 9.6 km || 
|-id=257 bgcolor=#fefefe
| 55257 ||  || — || September 12, 2001 || Socorro || LINEAR || MAS || align=right | 2.3 km || 
|-id=258 bgcolor=#E9E9E9
| 55258 ||  || — || September 12, 2001 || Socorro || LINEAR || — || align=right | 3.4 km || 
|-id=259 bgcolor=#E9E9E9
| 55259 ||  || — || September 12, 2001 || Socorro || LINEAR || — || align=right | 2.2 km || 
|-id=260 bgcolor=#fefefe
| 55260 ||  || — || September 12, 2001 || Socorro || LINEAR || — || align=right | 1.7 km || 
|-id=261 bgcolor=#d6d6d6
| 55261 ||  || — || September 12, 2001 || Socorro || LINEAR || — || align=right | 6.1 km || 
|-id=262 bgcolor=#fefefe
| 55262 ||  || — || September 12, 2001 || Socorro || LINEAR || FLO || align=right | 1.5 km || 
|-id=263 bgcolor=#E9E9E9
| 55263 ||  || — || September 12, 2001 || Socorro || LINEAR || — || align=right | 2.7 km || 
|-id=264 bgcolor=#E9E9E9
| 55264 ||  || — || September 12, 2001 || Socorro || LINEAR || MIS || align=right | 5.8 km || 
|-id=265 bgcolor=#d6d6d6
| 55265 ||  || — || September 12, 2001 || Socorro || LINEAR || — || align=right | 6.3 km || 
|-id=266 bgcolor=#E9E9E9
| 55266 ||  || — || September 12, 2001 || Socorro || LINEAR || — || align=right | 2.6 km || 
|-id=267 bgcolor=#C2FFFF
| 55267 ||  || — || September 12, 2001 || Socorro || LINEAR || L5 || align=right | 24 km || 
|-id=268 bgcolor=#E9E9E9
| 55268 ||  || — || September 12, 2001 || Socorro || LINEAR || — || align=right | 2.9 km || 
|-id=269 bgcolor=#E9E9E9
| 55269 ||  || — || September 12, 2001 || Socorro || LINEAR || — || align=right | 3.8 km || 
|-id=270 bgcolor=#d6d6d6
| 55270 ||  || — || September 10, 2001 || Anderson Mesa || LONEOS || — || align=right | 7.9 km || 
|-id=271 bgcolor=#fefefe
| 55271 ||  || — || September 11, 2001 || Anderson Mesa || LONEOS || V || align=right | 1.6 km || 
|-id=272 bgcolor=#E9E9E9
| 55272 ||  || — || September 12, 2001 || Socorro || LINEAR || — || align=right | 7.5 km || 
|-id=273 bgcolor=#E9E9E9
| 55273 || 2001 SY || — || September 17, 2001 || Desert Eagle || W. K. Y. Yeung || — || align=right | 6.7 km || 
|-id=274 bgcolor=#d6d6d6
| 55274 ||  || — || September 17, 2001 || Desert Eagle || W. K. Y. Yeung || — || align=right | 5.2 km || 
|-id=275 bgcolor=#d6d6d6
| 55275 ||  || — || September 18, 2001 || Desert Eagle || W. K. Y. Yeung || — || align=right | 7.8 km || 
|-id=276 bgcolor=#fefefe
| 55276 Kenlarner ||  ||  || September 16, 2001 || Needville || J. Dellinger, W. G. Dillon || — || align=right | 2.0 km || 
|-id=277 bgcolor=#d6d6d6
| 55277 ||  || — || September 16, 2001 || Socorro || LINEAR || — || align=right | 6.4 km || 
|-id=278 bgcolor=#d6d6d6
| 55278 ||  || — || September 16, 2001 || Socorro || LINEAR || THM || align=right | 6.0 km || 
|-id=279 bgcolor=#d6d6d6
| 55279 ||  || — || September 16, 2001 || Socorro || LINEAR || — || align=right | 4.5 km || 
|-id=280 bgcolor=#E9E9E9
| 55280 ||  || — || September 16, 2001 || Socorro || LINEAR || — || align=right | 5.7 km || 
|-id=281 bgcolor=#E9E9E9
| 55281 ||  || — || September 16, 2001 || Socorro || LINEAR || AST || align=right | 5.7 km || 
|-id=282 bgcolor=#d6d6d6
| 55282 ||  || — || September 16, 2001 || Socorro || LINEAR || KOR || align=right | 3.8 km || 
|-id=283 bgcolor=#d6d6d6
| 55283 ||  || — || September 16, 2001 || Socorro || LINEAR || — || align=right | 9.7 km || 
|-id=284 bgcolor=#E9E9E9
| 55284 ||  || — || September 16, 2001 || Socorro || LINEAR || — || align=right | 4.5 km || 
|-id=285 bgcolor=#E9E9E9
| 55285 ||  || — || September 16, 2001 || Socorro || LINEAR || — || align=right | 3.2 km || 
|-id=286 bgcolor=#E9E9E9
| 55286 ||  || — || September 16, 2001 || Socorro || LINEAR || — || align=right | 5.7 km || 
|-id=287 bgcolor=#E9E9E9
| 55287 ||  || — || September 16, 2001 || Socorro || LINEAR || — || align=right | 3.5 km || 
|-id=288 bgcolor=#d6d6d6
| 55288 ||  || — || September 16, 2001 || Socorro || LINEAR || KOR || align=right | 4.2 km || 
|-id=289 bgcolor=#d6d6d6
| 55289 ||  || — || September 16, 2001 || Socorro || LINEAR || EOS || align=right | 4.2 km || 
|-id=290 bgcolor=#E9E9E9
| 55290 ||  || — || September 16, 2001 || Socorro || LINEAR || — || align=right | 6.7 km || 
|-id=291 bgcolor=#fefefe
| 55291 ||  || — || September 16, 2001 || Socorro || LINEAR || V || align=right | 1.6 km || 
|-id=292 bgcolor=#E9E9E9
| 55292 ||  || — || September 16, 2001 || Socorro || LINEAR || — || align=right | 6.1 km || 
|-id=293 bgcolor=#fefefe
| 55293 ||  || — || September 16, 2001 || Socorro || LINEAR || V || align=right | 1.3 km || 
|-id=294 bgcolor=#d6d6d6
| 55294 ||  || — || September 16, 2001 || Socorro || LINEAR || — || align=right | 5.5 km || 
|-id=295 bgcolor=#E9E9E9
| 55295 ||  || — || September 16, 2001 || Socorro || LINEAR || — || align=right | 3.7 km || 
|-id=296 bgcolor=#fefefe
| 55296 ||  || — || September 16, 2001 || Socorro || LINEAR || — || align=right | 2.2 km || 
|-id=297 bgcolor=#E9E9E9
| 55297 ||  || — || September 16, 2001 || Socorro || LINEAR || — || align=right | 3.9 km || 
|-id=298 bgcolor=#fefefe
| 55298 ||  || — || September 16, 2001 || Socorro || LINEAR || NYS || align=right | 1.9 km || 
|-id=299 bgcolor=#E9E9E9
| 55299 ||  || — || September 16, 2001 || Socorro || LINEAR || EUN || align=right | 3.0 km || 
|-id=300 bgcolor=#d6d6d6
| 55300 ||  || — || September 16, 2001 || Socorro || LINEAR || — || align=right | 6.9 km || 
|}

55301–55400 

|-bgcolor=#d6d6d6
| 55301 ||  || — || September 16, 2001 || Socorro || LINEAR || KOR || align=right | 4.0 km || 
|-id=302 bgcolor=#E9E9E9
| 55302 ||  || — || September 16, 2001 || Socorro || LINEAR || HOF || align=right | 9.5 km || 
|-id=303 bgcolor=#E9E9E9
| 55303 ||  || — || September 16, 2001 || Socorro || LINEAR || AGN || align=right | 3.0 km || 
|-id=304 bgcolor=#E9E9E9
| 55304 ||  || — || September 16, 2001 || Socorro || LINEAR || — || align=right | 4.1 km || 
|-id=305 bgcolor=#d6d6d6
| 55305 ||  || — || September 16, 2001 || Socorro || LINEAR || — || align=right | 7.5 km || 
|-id=306 bgcolor=#d6d6d6
| 55306 ||  || — || September 16, 2001 || Socorro || LINEAR || HYG || align=right | 8.3 km || 
|-id=307 bgcolor=#d6d6d6
| 55307 ||  || — || September 16, 2001 || Socorro || LINEAR || HYG || align=right | 8.3 km || 
|-id=308 bgcolor=#E9E9E9
| 55308 ||  || — || September 16, 2001 || Socorro || LINEAR || MRX || align=right | 3.8 km || 
|-id=309 bgcolor=#d6d6d6
| 55309 ||  || — || September 17, 2001 || Socorro || LINEAR || — || align=right | 9.8 km || 
|-id=310 bgcolor=#d6d6d6
| 55310 ||  || — || September 17, 2001 || Socorro || LINEAR || KOR || align=right | 3.8 km || 
|-id=311 bgcolor=#d6d6d6
| 55311 ||  || — || September 17, 2001 || Socorro || LINEAR || KOR || align=right | 3.1 km || 
|-id=312 bgcolor=#d6d6d6
| 55312 ||  || — || September 17, 2001 || Socorro || LINEAR || — || align=right | 9.7 km || 
|-id=313 bgcolor=#E9E9E9
| 55313 ||  || — || September 17, 2001 || Socorro || LINEAR || — || align=right | 4.3 km || 
|-id=314 bgcolor=#E9E9E9
| 55314 ||  || — || September 17, 2001 || Socorro || LINEAR || — || align=right | 7.1 km || 
|-id=315 bgcolor=#fefefe
| 55315 ||  || — || September 17, 2001 || Socorro || LINEAR || V || align=right | 2.4 km || 
|-id=316 bgcolor=#d6d6d6
| 55316 ||  || — || September 17, 2001 || Socorro || LINEAR || — || align=right | 6.6 km || 
|-id=317 bgcolor=#E9E9E9
| 55317 ||  || — || September 17, 2001 || Socorro || LINEAR || — || align=right | 3.5 km || 
|-id=318 bgcolor=#fefefe
| 55318 ||  || — || September 17, 2001 || Socorro || LINEAR || — || align=right | 4.8 km || 
|-id=319 bgcolor=#d6d6d6
| 55319 Takanashi ||  ||  || September 18, 2001 || Goodricke-Pigott || R. A. Tucker || — || align=right | 8.0 km || 
|-id=320 bgcolor=#d6d6d6
| 55320 Busler ||  ||  || September 19, 2001 || Goodricke-Pigott || R. A. Tucker || — || align=right | 7.4 km || 
|-id=321 bgcolor=#E9E9E9
| 55321 ||  || — || September 19, 2001 || Socorro || LINEAR || — || align=right | 4.9 km || 
|-id=322 bgcolor=#fefefe
| 55322 ||  || — || September 20, 2001 || Socorro || LINEAR || — || align=right | 2.0 km || 
|-id=323 bgcolor=#E9E9E9
| 55323 ||  || — || September 20, 2001 || Socorro || LINEAR || — || align=right | 5.2 km || 
|-id=324 bgcolor=#d6d6d6
| 55324 ||  || — || September 20, 2001 || Socorro || LINEAR || — || align=right | 13 km || 
|-id=325 bgcolor=#d6d6d6
| 55325 ||  || — || September 20, 2001 || Socorro || LINEAR || EOS || align=right | 5.6 km || 
|-id=326 bgcolor=#E9E9E9
| 55326 ||  || — || September 20, 2001 || Socorro || LINEAR || — || align=right | 3.8 km || 
|-id=327 bgcolor=#E9E9E9
| 55327 ||  || — || September 20, 2001 || Socorro || LINEAR || GEF || align=right | 4.7 km || 
|-id=328 bgcolor=#d6d6d6
| 55328 ||  || — || September 20, 2001 || Socorro || LINEAR || EOS || align=right | 7.8 km || 
|-id=329 bgcolor=#fefefe
| 55329 ||  || — || September 20, 2001 || Socorro || LINEAR || — || align=right | 2.2 km || 
|-id=330 bgcolor=#E9E9E9
| 55330 ||  || — || September 20, 2001 || Desert Eagle || W. K. Y. Yeung || — || align=right | 4.3 km || 
|-id=331 bgcolor=#d6d6d6
| 55331 Putzi ||  ||  || September 21, 2001 || Fountain Hills || C. W. Juels, P. R. Holvorcem || — || align=right | 11 km || 
|-id=332 bgcolor=#fefefe
| 55332 ||  || — || September 16, 2001 || Socorro || LINEAR || — || align=right | 2.6 km || 
|-id=333 bgcolor=#E9E9E9
| 55333 ||  || — || September 16, 2001 || Socorro || LINEAR || — || align=right | 3.9 km || 
|-id=334 bgcolor=#d6d6d6
| 55334 ||  || — || September 16, 2001 || Socorro || LINEAR || HYG || align=right | 9.5 km || 
|-id=335 bgcolor=#d6d6d6
| 55335 ||  || — || September 16, 2001 || Socorro || LINEAR || — || align=right | 9.1 km || 
|-id=336 bgcolor=#E9E9E9
| 55336 ||  || — || September 16, 2001 || Socorro || LINEAR || — || align=right | 5.5 km || 
|-id=337 bgcolor=#E9E9E9
| 55337 ||  || — || September 16, 2001 || Socorro || LINEAR || — || align=right | 3.4 km || 
|-id=338 bgcolor=#d6d6d6
| 55338 ||  || — || September 16, 2001 || Socorro || LINEAR || EOS || align=right | 6.2 km || 
|-id=339 bgcolor=#E9E9E9
| 55339 ||  || — || September 16, 2001 || Socorro || LINEAR || — || align=right | 2.7 km || 
|-id=340 bgcolor=#fefefe
| 55340 ||  || — || September 16, 2001 || Socorro || LINEAR || — || align=right | 3.9 km || 
|-id=341 bgcolor=#fefefe
| 55341 ||  || — || September 16, 2001 || Socorro || LINEAR || — || align=right | 1.8 km || 
|-id=342 bgcolor=#d6d6d6
| 55342 ||  || — || September 16, 2001 || Socorro || LINEAR || — || align=right | 5.7 km || 
|-id=343 bgcolor=#d6d6d6
| 55343 ||  || — || September 16, 2001 || Socorro || LINEAR || — || align=right | 4.9 km || 
|-id=344 bgcolor=#E9E9E9
| 55344 ||  || — || September 16, 2001 || Socorro || LINEAR || — || align=right | 2.3 km || 
|-id=345 bgcolor=#E9E9E9
| 55345 ||  || — || September 16, 2001 || Socorro || LINEAR || — || align=right | 1.8 km || 
|-id=346 bgcolor=#fefefe
| 55346 ||  || — || September 16, 2001 || Socorro || LINEAR || MAS || align=right | 1.7 km || 
|-id=347 bgcolor=#d6d6d6
| 55347 ||  || — || September 16, 2001 || Socorro || LINEAR || 3:2 || align=right | 9.1 km || 
|-id=348 bgcolor=#E9E9E9
| 55348 ||  || — || September 16, 2001 || Socorro || LINEAR || — || align=right | 4.5 km || 
|-id=349 bgcolor=#d6d6d6
| 55349 ||  || — || September 16, 2001 || Socorro || LINEAR || — || align=right | 6.4 km || 
|-id=350 bgcolor=#d6d6d6
| 55350 ||  || — || September 17, 2001 || Socorro || LINEAR || KOR || align=right | 4.8 km || 
|-id=351 bgcolor=#d6d6d6
| 55351 ||  || — || September 17, 2001 || Socorro || LINEAR || — || align=right | 8.8 km || 
|-id=352 bgcolor=#fefefe
| 55352 ||  || — || September 17, 2001 || Socorro || LINEAR || — || align=right | 1.9 km || 
|-id=353 bgcolor=#E9E9E9
| 55353 ||  || — || September 17, 2001 || Socorro || LINEAR || HEN || align=right | 3.6 km || 
|-id=354 bgcolor=#d6d6d6
| 55354 ||  || — || September 17, 2001 || Socorro || LINEAR || HYG || align=right | 7.7 km || 
|-id=355 bgcolor=#d6d6d6
| 55355 ||  || — || September 17, 2001 || Socorro || LINEAR || — || align=right | 7.1 km || 
|-id=356 bgcolor=#d6d6d6
| 55356 ||  || — || September 17, 2001 || Socorro || LINEAR || — || align=right | 7.5 km || 
|-id=357 bgcolor=#E9E9E9
| 55357 ||  || — || September 17, 2001 || Socorro || LINEAR || MRX || align=right | 3.8 km || 
|-id=358 bgcolor=#E9E9E9
| 55358 ||  || — || September 17, 2001 || Socorro || LINEAR || — || align=right | 3.5 km || 
|-id=359 bgcolor=#E9E9E9
| 55359 ||  || — || September 16, 2001 || Socorro || LINEAR || — || align=right | 3.7 km || 
|-id=360 bgcolor=#E9E9E9
| 55360 ||  || — || September 16, 2001 || Socorro || LINEAR || — || align=right | 4.8 km || 
|-id=361 bgcolor=#E9E9E9
| 55361 ||  || — || September 16, 2001 || Socorro || LINEAR || EUN || align=right | 3.0 km || 
|-id=362 bgcolor=#E9E9E9
| 55362 ||  || — || September 17, 2001 || Socorro || LINEAR || — || align=right | 5.0 km || 
|-id=363 bgcolor=#d6d6d6
| 55363 ||  || — || September 17, 2001 || Socorro || LINEAR || — || align=right | 7.6 km || 
|-id=364 bgcolor=#E9E9E9
| 55364 ||  || — || September 19, 2001 || Socorro || LINEAR || — || align=right | 5.2 km || 
|-id=365 bgcolor=#d6d6d6
| 55365 ||  || — || September 19, 2001 || Socorro || LINEAR || — || align=right | 3.8 km || 
|-id=366 bgcolor=#fefefe
| 55366 ||  || — || September 19, 2001 || Socorro || LINEAR || — || align=right | 3.6 km || 
|-id=367 bgcolor=#d6d6d6
| 55367 ||  || — || September 19, 2001 || Socorro || LINEAR || EOS || align=right | 4.3 km || 
|-id=368 bgcolor=#d6d6d6
| 55368 ||  || — || September 19, 2001 || Socorro || LINEAR || THM || align=right | 6.4 km || 
|-id=369 bgcolor=#fefefe
| 55369 ||  || — || September 19, 2001 || Socorro || LINEAR || NYS || align=right | 1.9 km || 
|-id=370 bgcolor=#d6d6d6
| 55370 ||  || — || September 19, 2001 || Socorro || LINEAR || — || align=right | 3.5 km || 
|-id=371 bgcolor=#d6d6d6
| 55371 ||  || — || September 19, 2001 || Socorro || LINEAR || — || align=right | 6.9 km || 
|-id=372 bgcolor=#d6d6d6
| 55372 ||  || — || September 19, 2001 || Socorro || LINEAR || HYG || align=right | 7.8 km || 
|-id=373 bgcolor=#fefefe
| 55373 ||  || — || September 19, 2001 || Socorro || LINEAR || NYS || align=right | 1.8 km || 
|-id=374 bgcolor=#fefefe
| 55374 ||  || — || September 19, 2001 || Socorro || LINEAR || — || align=right | 2.7 km || 
|-id=375 bgcolor=#d6d6d6
| 55375 ||  || — || September 19, 2001 || Socorro || LINEAR || — || align=right | 4.7 km || 
|-id=376 bgcolor=#fefefe
| 55376 ||  || — || September 19, 2001 || Socorro || LINEAR || V || align=right | 2.1 km || 
|-id=377 bgcolor=#E9E9E9
| 55377 ||  || — || September 19, 2001 || Socorro || LINEAR || — || align=right | 7.5 km || 
|-id=378 bgcolor=#E9E9E9
| 55378 ||  || — || September 19, 2001 || Socorro || LINEAR || — || align=right | 4.0 km || 
|-id=379 bgcolor=#E9E9E9
| 55379 ||  || — || September 19, 2001 || Socorro || LINEAR || — || align=right | 7.6 km || 
|-id=380 bgcolor=#FA8072
| 55380 ||  || — || September 24, 2001 || Socorro || LINEAR || — || align=right | 2.9 km || 
|-id=381 bgcolor=#d6d6d6
| 55381 Lautakwah ||  ||  || September 25, 2001 || Desert Eagle || W. K. Y. Yeung || — || align=right | 8.4 km || 
|-id=382 bgcolor=#E9E9E9
| 55382 Kootinlok ||  ||  || September 25, 2001 || Desert Eagle || W. K. Y. Yeung || — || align=right | 3.5 km || 
|-id=383 bgcolor=#d6d6d6
| 55383 Cheungkwokwing ||  ||  || September 25, 2001 || Desert Eagle || W. K. Y. Yeung || — || align=right | 6.0 km || 
|-id=384 bgcolor=#fefefe
| 55384 Muiyimfong ||  ||  || September 25, 2001 || Desert Eagle || W. K. Y. Yeung || NYS || align=right | 2.4 km || 
|-id=385 bgcolor=#fefefe
| 55385 ||  || — || September 20, 2001 || Socorro || LINEAR || — || align=right | 4.1 km || 
|-id=386 bgcolor=#d6d6d6
| 55386 ||  || — || September 20, 2001 || Socorro || LINEAR || — || align=right | 8.2 km || 
|-id=387 bgcolor=#fefefe
| 55387 ||  || — || September 20, 2001 || Socorro || LINEAR || NYS || align=right | 2.3 km || 
|-id=388 bgcolor=#fefefe
| 55388 ||  || — || September 21, 2001 || Palomar || NEAT || — || align=right | 1.9 km || 
|-id=389 bgcolor=#E9E9E9
| 55389 ||  || — || September 21, 2001 || Palomar || NEAT || EUN || align=right | 4.7 km || 
|-id=390 bgcolor=#d6d6d6
| 55390 ||  || — || September 21, 2001 || Palomar || NEAT || EOS || align=right | 4.8 km || 
|-id=391 bgcolor=#fefefe
| 55391 ||  || — || September 21, 2001 || Anderson Mesa || LONEOS || — || align=right | 4.5 km || 
|-id=392 bgcolor=#d6d6d6
| 55392 ||  || — || September 21, 2001 || Anderson Mesa || LONEOS || KOR || align=right | 3.8 km || 
|-id=393 bgcolor=#d6d6d6
| 55393 ||  || — || September 21, 2001 || Anderson Mesa || LONEOS || KOR || align=right | 3.1 km || 
|-id=394 bgcolor=#E9E9E9
| 55394 ||  || — || September 21, 2001 || Anderson Mesa || LONEOS || — || align=right | 4.6 km || 
|-id=395 bgcolor=#E9E9E9
| 55395 ||  || — || September 28, 2001 || Fountain Hills || C. W. Juels, P. R. Holvorcem || — || align=right | 4.7 km || 
|-id=396 bgcolor=#E9E9E9
| 55396 ||  || — || September 27, 2001 || Palomar || NEAT || MAR || align=right | 3.0 km || 
|-id=397 bgcolor=#E9E9E9
| 55397 Hackman ||  ||  || September 22, 2001 || Goodricke-Pigott || R. A. Tucker || PAD || align=right | 7.8 km || 
|-id=398 bgcolor=#d6d6d6
| 55398 ||  || — || September 29, 2001 || Palomar || NEAT || VER || align=right | 6.9 km || 
|-id=399 bgcolor=#E9E9E9
| 55399 ||  || — || September 17, 2001 || Anderson Mesa || LONEOS || EUN || align=right | 3.6 km || 
|-id=400 bgcolor=#fefefe
| 55400 ||  || — || September 25, 2001 || Socorro || LINEAR || KLI || align=right | 3.8 km || 
|}

55401–55500 

|-bgcolor=#FA8072
| 55401 ||  || — || September 24, 2001 || Anderson Mesa || LONEOS || — || align=right | 3.5 km || 
|-id=402 bgcolor=#d6d6d6
| 55402 ||  || — || September 25, 2001 || Socorro || LINEAR || HYG || align=right | 4.7 km || 
|-id=403 bgcolor=#d6d6d6
| 55403 ||  || — || September 16, 2001 || Socorro || LINEAR || — || align=right | 10 km || 
|-id=404 bgcolor=#d6d6d6
| 55404 ||  || — || September 22, 2001 || Palomar || NEAT || — || align=right | 10 km || 
|-id=405 bgcolor=#d6d6d6
| 55405 ||  || — || September 18, 2001 || Palomar || NEAT || EOS || align=right | 5.2 km || 
|-id=406 bgcolor=#d6d6d6
| 55406 ||  || — || October 8, 2001 || Palomar || NEAT || — || align=right | 6.8 km || 
|-id=407 bgcolor=#d6d6d6
| 55407 ||  || — || October 11, 2001 || Farpoint || Farpoint Obs. || EOS || align=right | 4.1 km || 
|-id=408 bgcolor=#FFC2E0
| 55408 ||  || — || October 11, 2001 || Socorro || LINEAR || APO || align=right data-sort-value="0.46" | 460 m || 
|-id=409 bgcolor=#E9E9E9
| 55409 ||  || — || October 5, 2001 || Palomar || NEAT || — || align=right | 4.0 km || 
|-id=410 bgcolor=#fefefe
| 55410 ||  || — || October 7, 2001 || Palomar || NEAT || NYS || align=right | 2.1 km || 
|-id=411 bgcolor=#d6d6d6
| 55411 ||  || — || October 7, 2001 || Palomar || NEAT || — || align=right | 6.8 km || 
|-id=412 bgcolor=#fefefe
| 55412 ||  || — || October 7, 2001 || Palomar || NEAT || NYS || align=right | 2.2 km || 
|-id=413 bgcolor=#d6d6d6
| 55413 ||  || — || October 9, 2001 || Socorro || LINEAR || EOS || align=right | 6.3 km || 
|-id=414 bgcolor=#E9E9E9
| 55414 ||  || — || October 11, 2001 || Socorro || LINEAR || EUN || align=right | 3.0 km || 
|-id=415 bgcolor=#E9E9E9
| 55415 ||  || — || October 13, 2001 || Socorro || LINEAR || — || align=right | 3.6 km || 
|-id=416 bgcolor=#E9E9E9
| 55416 ||  || — || October 11, 2001 || Socorro || LINEAR || ADE || align=right | 7.7 km || 
|-id=417 bgcolor=#d6d6d6
| 55417 ||  || — || October 11, 2001 || Socorro || LINEAR || — || align=right | 9.9 km || 
|-id=418 bgcolor=#d6d6d6
| 55418 Bianciardi ||  ||  || October 13, 2001 || San Marcello || L. Tesi, M. Tombelli || SAN || align=right | 4.9 km || 
|-id=419 bgcolor=#C2FFFF
| 55419 ||  || — || October 9, 2001 || Socorro || LINEAR || L5ENM || align=right | 31 km || 
|-id=420 bgcolor=#d6d6d6
| 55420 ||  || — || October 9, 2001 || Socorro || LINEAR || ALA || align=right | 14 km || 
|-id=421 bgcolor=#d6d6d6
| 55421 ||  || — || October 14, 2001 || Socorro || LINEAR || HYG || align=right | 5.8 km || 
|-id=422 bgcolor=#d6d6d6
| 55422 ||  || — || October 14, 2001 || Socorro || LINEAR || 628 || align=right | 4.0 km || 
|-id=423 bgcolor=#d6d6d6
| 55423 ||  || — || October 14, 2001 || Socorro || LINEAR || — || align=right | 6.6 km || 
|-id=424 bgcolor=#E9E9E9
| 55424 ||  || — || October 14, 2001 || Socorro || LINEAR || — || align=right | 3.0 km || 
|-id=425 bgcolor=#E9E9E9
| 55425 ||  || — || October 14, 2001 || Socorro || LINEAR || — || align=right | 9.5 km || 
|-id=426 bgcolor=#E9E9E9
| 55426 ||  || — || October 14, 2001 || Desert Eagle || W. K. Y. Yeung || — || align=right | 6.0 km || 
|-id=427 bgcolor=#E9E9E9
| 55427 ||  || — || October 14, 2001 || Cima Ekar || ADAS || — || align=right | 5.8 km || 
|-id=428 bgcolor=#E9E9E9
| 55428 Cappellaro ||  ||  || October 14, 2001 || Cima Ekar || ADAS || — || align=right | 3.1 km || 
|-id=429 bgcolor=#d6d6d6
| 55429 ||  || — || October 13, 2001 || Socorro || LINEAR || — || align=right | 6.1 km || 
|-id=430 bgcolor=#d6d6d6
| 55430 ||  || — || October 13, 2001 || Socorro || LINEAR || KOR || align=right | 5.0 km || 
|-id=431 bgcolor=#d6d6d6
| 55431 ||  || — || October 14, 2001 || Socorro || LINEAR || — || align=right | 7.1 km || 
|-id=432 bgcolor=#d6d6d6
| 55432 ||  || — || October 15, 2001 || Desert Eagle || W. K. Y. Yeung || EOS || align=right | 6.1 km || 
|-id=433 bgcolor=#fefefe
| 55433 ||  || — || October 13, 2001 || Socorro || LINEAR || — || align=right | 2.7 km || 
|-id=434 bgcolor=#d6d6d6
| 55434 ||  || — || October 13, 2001 || Socorro || LINEAR || K-2 || align=right | 3.6 km || 
|-id=435 bgcolor=#d6d6d6
| 55435 ||  || — || October 13, 2001 || Socorro || LINEAR || THM || align=right | 6.4 km || 
|-id=436 bgcolor=#E9E9E9
| 55436 ||  || — || October 13, 2001 || Socorro || LINEAR || — || align=right | 2.3 km || 
|-id=437 bgcolor=#E9E9E9
| 55437 ||  || — || October 13, 2001 || Socorro || LINEAR || HEN || align=right | 3.3 km || 
|-id=438 bgcolor=#fefefe
| 55438 ||  || — || October 13, 2001 || Socorro || LINEAR || FLO || align=right | 3.1 km || 
|-id=439 bgcolor=#d6d6d6
| 55439 ||  || — || October 14, 2001 || Socorro || LINEAR || SHU3:2 || align=right | 12 km || 
|-id=440 bgcolor=#fefefe
| 55440 ||  || — || October 14, 2001 || Socorro || LINEAR || ERI || align=right | 4.9 km || 
|-id=441 bgcolor=#C2FFFF
| 55441 ||  || — || October 14, 2001 || Socorro || LINEAR || L5 || align=right | 16 km || 
|-id=442 bgcolor=#d6d6d6
| 55442 ||  || — || October 14, 2001 || Socorro || LINEAR || EOS || align=right | 4.1 km || 
|-id=443 bgcolor=#d6d6d6
| 55443 ||  || — || October 14, 2001 || Socorro || LINEAR || HYG || align=right | 5.7 km || 
|-id=444 bgcolor=#d6d6d6
| 55444 ||  || — || October 14, 2001 || Socorro || LINEAR || — || align=right | 8.3 km || 
|-id=445 bgcolor=#d6d6d6
| 55445 ||  || — || October 15, 2001 || Socorro || LINEAR || — || align=right | 7.7 km || 
|-id=446 bgcolor=#d6d6d6
| 55446 ||  || — || October 14, 2001 || Socorro || LINEAR || EOS || align=right | 5.0 km || 
|-id=447 bgcolor=#E9E9E9
| 55447 ||  || — || October 14, 2001 || Socorro || LINEAR || PAD || align=right | 3.9 km || 
|-id=448 bgcolor=#fefefe
| 55448 ||  || — || October 14, 2001 || Socorro || LINEAR || FLO || align=right | 2.2 km || 
|-id=449 bgcolor=#d6d6d6
| 55449 ||  || — || October 15, 2001 || Socorro || LINEAR || — || align=right | 9.7 km || 
|-id=450 bgcolor=#E9E9E9
| 55450 ||  || — || October 15, 2001 || Socorro || LINEAR || — || align=right | 4.8 km || 
|-id=451 bgcolor=#E9E9E9
| 55451 ||  || — || October 12, 2001 || Haleakala || NEAT || ADE || align=right | 7.8 km || 
|-id=452 bgcolor=#d6d6d6
| 55452 ||  || — || October 12, 2001 || Haleakala || NEAT || — || align=right | 9.2 km || 
|-id=453 bgcolor=#d6d6d6
| 55453 ||  || — || October 10, 2001 || Palomar || NEAT || — || align=right | 10 km || 
|-id=454 bgcolor=#fefefe
| 55454 ||  || — || October 11, 2001 || Palomar || NEAT || KLI || align=right | 4.2 km || 
|-id=455 bgcolor=#E9E9E9
| 55455 ||  || — || October 11, 2001 || Palomar || NEAT || — || align=right | 7.8 km || 
|-id=456 bgcolor=#fefefe
| 55456 ||  || — || October 11, 2001 || Palomar || NEAT || — || align=right | 1.9 km || 
|-id=457 bgcolor=#C2FFFF
| 55457 ||  || — || October 12, 2001 || Haleakala || NEAT || L5 || align=right | 24 km || 
|-id=458 bgcolor=#d6d6d6
| 55458 ||  || — || October 14, 2001 || Palomar || NEAT || EOS || align=right | 6.8 km || 
|-id=459 bgcolor=#fefefe
| 55459 ||  || — || October 10, 2001 || Palomar || NEAT || V || align=right | 1.7 km || 
|-id=460 bgcolor=#C2FFFF
| 55460 ||  || — || October 10, 2001 || Palomar || NEAT || L5 || align=right | 15 km || 
|-id=461 bgcolor=#E9E9E9
| 55461 ||  || — || October 15, 2001 || Palomar || NEAT || MAR || align=right | 2.5 km || 
|-id=462 bgcolor=#d6d6d6
| 55462 ||  || — || October 15, 2001 || Palomar || NEAT || — || align=right | 6.8 km || 
|-id=463 bgcolor=#fefefe
| 55463 ||  || — || October 15, 2001 || Kitt Peak || Spacewatch || NYS || align=right | 2.0 km || 
|-id=464 bgcolor=#E9E9E9
| 55464 ||  || — || October 15, 2001 || Palomar || NEAT || — || align=right | 3.2 km || 
|-id=465 bgcolor=#E9E9E9
| 55465 ||  || — || October 15, 2001 || Socorro || LINEAR || ADE || align=right | 6.0 km || 
|-id=466 bgcolor=#E9E9E9
| 55466 ||  || — || October 15, 2001 || Socorro || LINEAR || — || align=right | 8.8 km || 
|-id=467 bgcolor=#fefefe
| 55467 ||  || — || October 13, 2001 || Socorro || LINEAR || — || align=right | 2.4 km || 
|-id=468 bgcolor=#E9E9E9
| 55468 ||  || — || October 15, 2001 || Palomar || NEAT || — || align=right | 3.4 km || 
|-id=469 bgcolor=#E9E9E9
| 55469 ||  || — || October 11, 2001 || Socorro || LINEAR || EUN || align=right | 3.2 km || 
|-id=470 bgcolor=#d6d6d6
| 55470 ||  || — || October 14, 2001 || Palomar || NEAT || URS || align=right | 8.1 km || 
|-id=471 bgcolor=#d6d6d6
| 55471 ||  || — || October 15, 2001 || Palomar || NEAT || DUR || align=right | 11 km || 
|-id=472 bgcolor=#E9E9E9
| 55472 ||  || — || October 15, 2001 || Socorro || LINEAR || MAR || align=right | 3.3 km || 
|-id=473 bgcolor=#E9E9E9
| 55473 ||  || — || October 15, 2001 || Socorro || LINEAR || — || align=right | 3.8 km || 
|-id=474 bgcolor=#C2FFFF
| 55474 ||  || — || October 15, 2001 || Palomar || NEAT || L5 || align=right | 21 km || 
|-id=475 bgcolor=#d6d6d6
| 55475 ||  || — || October 15, 2001 || Palomar || NEAT || — || align=right | 4.5 km || 
|-id=476 bgcolor=#d6d6d6
| 55476 ||  || — || October 15, 2001 || Haleakala || NEAT || — || align=right | 14 km || 
|-id=477 bgcolor=#d6d6d6
| 55477 Soroban ||  ||  || October 18, 2001 || Shishikui || H. Maeno || — || align=right | 8.1 km || 
|-id=478 bgcolor=#E9E9E9
| 55478 ||  || — || October 17, 2001 || Socorro || LINEAR || — || align=right | 3.5 km || 
|-id=479 bgcolor=#E9E9E9
| 55479 ||  || — || October 25, 2001 || Desert Eagle || W. K. Y. Yeung || EUN || align=right | 3.6 km || 
|-id=480 bgcolor=#E9E9E9
| 55480 ||  || — || October 17, 2001 || Palomar || NEAT || — || align=right | 3.0 km || 
|-id=481 bgcolor=#d6d6d6
| 55481 ||  || — || October 17, 2001 || Socorro || LINEAR || — || align=right | 9.2 km || 
|-id=482 bgcolor=#fefefe
| 55482 ||  || — || October 17, 2001 || Socorro || LINEAR || — || align=right | 3.0 km || 
|-id=483 bgcolor=#d6d6d6
| 55483 ||  || — || October 18, 2001 || Socorro || LINEAR || 7:4 || align=right | 13 km || 
|-id=484 bgcolor=#E9E9E9
| 55484 ||  || — || October 18, 2001 || Socorro || LINEAR || EUN || align=right | 6.1 km || 
|-id=485 bgcolor=#d6d6d6
| 55485 ||  || — || October 18, 2001 || Socorro || LINEAR || — || align=right | 6.1 km || 
|-id=486 bgcolor=#fefefe
| 55486 ||  || — || October 16, 2001 || Socorro || LINEAR || V || align=right | 2.9 km || 
|-id=487 bgcolor=#d6d6d6
| 55487 ||  || — || October 16, 2001 || Socorro || LINEAR || VER || align=right | 4.4 km || 
|-id=488 bgcolor=#E9E9E9
| 55488 ||  || — || October 17, 2001 || Socorro || LINEAR || — || align=right | 7.0 km || 
|-id=489 bgcolor=#fefefe
| 55489 ||  || — || October 17, 2001 || Socorro || LINEAR || — || align=right | 2.5 km || 
|-id=490 bgcolor=#fefefe
| 55490 ||  || — || October 17, 2001 || Socorro || LINEAR || NYS || align=right | 6.0 km || 
|-id=491 bgcolor=#d6d6d6
| 55491 ||  || — || October 17, 2001 || Socorro || LINEAR || THM || align=right | 7.7 km || 
|-id=492 bgcolor=#fefefe
| 55492 ||  || — || October 17, 2001 || Socorro || LINEAR || — || align=right | 2.1 km || 
|-id=493 bgcolor=#E9E9E9
| 55493 ||  || — || October 17, 2001 || Socorro || LINEAR || — || align=right | 7.4 km || 
|-id=494 bgcolor=#d6d6d6
| 55494 ||  || — || October 17, 2001 || Socorro || LINEAR || EOS || align=right | 5.6 km || 
|-id=495 bgcolor=#d6d6d6
| 55495 ||  || — || October 17, 2001 || Socorro || LINEAR || — || align=right | 6.7 km || 
|-id=496 bgcolor=#C2FFFF
| 55496 ||  || — || October 16, 2001 || Socorro || LINEAR || L5 || align=right | 20 km || 
|-id=497 bgcolor=#d6d6d6
| 55497 ||  || — || October 20, 2001 || Socorro || LINEAR || KOR || align=right | 3.2 km || 
|-id=498 bgcolor=#d6d6d6
| 55498 ||  || — || October 20, 2001 || Socorro || LINEAR || 3:2 || align=right | 9.6 km || 
|-id=499 bgcolor=#E9E9E9
| 55499 ||  || — || October 20, 2001 || Socorro || LINEAR || GEF || align=right | 4.6 km || 
|-id=500 bgcolor=#d6d6d6
| 55500 ||  || — || October 21, 2001 || Kitt Peak || Spacewatch || — || align=right | 5.8 km || 
|}

55501–55600 

|-bgcolor=#d6d6d6
| 55501 ||  || — || October 18, 2001 || Palomar || NEAT || — || align=right | 6.3 km || 
|-id=502 bgcolor=#d6d6d6
| 55502 ||  || — || October 19, 2001 || Haleakala || NEAT || — || align=right | 7.7 km || 
|-id=503 bgcolor=#d6d6d6
| 55503 ||  || — || October 17, 2001 || Socorro || LINEAR || — || align=right | 4.0 km || 
|-id=504 bgcolor=#d6d6d6
| 55504 ||  || — || October 21, 2001 || Socorro || LINEAR || — || align=right | 3.4 km || 
|-id=505 bgcolor=#d6d6d6
| 55505 ||  || — || October 22, 2001 || Socorro || LINEAR || SHU3:2 || align=right | 13 km || 
|-id=506 bgcolor=#fefefe
| 55506 ||  || — || October 22, 2001 || Socorro || LINEAR || — || align=right | 2.9 km || 
|-id=507 bgcolor=#E9E9E9
| 55507 ||  || — || October 22, 2001 || Socorro || LINEAR || — || align=right | 3.8 km || 
|-id=508 bgcolor=#d6d6d6
| 55508 ||  || — || October 22, 2001 || Palomar || NEAT || — || align=right | 8.2 km || 
|-id=509 bgcolor=#d6d6d6
| 55509 ||  || — || October 23, 2001 || Socorro || LINEAR || KOR || align=right | 2.8 km || 
|-id=510 bgcolor=#d6d6d6
| 55510 ||  || — || October 23, 2001 || Socorro || LINEAR || EOS || align=right | 5.0 km || 
|-id=511 bgcolor=#E9E9E9
| 55511 ||  || — || October 21, 2001 || Socorro || LINEAR || HEN || align=right | 2.9 km || 
|-id=512 bgcolor=#d6d6d6
| 55512 ||  || — || October 23, 2001 || Palomar || NEAT || — || align=right | 6.4 km || 
|-id=513 bgcolor=#E9E9E9
| 55513 ||  || — || October 16, 2001 || Palomar || NEAT || — || align=right | 3.4 km || 
|-id=514 bgcolor=#d6d6d6
| 55514 ||  || — || November 9, 2001 || Socorro || LINEAR || — || align=right | 5.6 km || 
|-id=515 bgcolor=#d6d6d6
| 55515 ||  || — || November 9, 2001 || Socorro || LINEAR || — || align=right | 6.3 km || 
|-id=516 bgcolor=#d6d6d6
| 55516 ||  || — || November 9, 2001 || Socorro || LINEAR || THM || align=right | 5.2 km || 
|-id=517 bgcolor=#d6d6d6
| 55517 ||  || — || November 9, 2001 || Socorro || LINEAR || — || align=right | 6.8 km || 
|-id=518 bgcolor=#fefefe
| 55518 ||  || — || November 9, 2001 || Socorro || LINEAR || NYS || align=right | 1.5 km || 
|-id=519 bgcolor=#fefefe
| 55519 ||  || — || November 9, 2001 || Socorro || LINEAR || PHO || align=right | 7.8 km || 
|-id=520 bgcolor=#E9E9E9
| 55520 ||  || — || November 9, 2001 || Socorro || LINEAR || MAR || align=right | 4.2 km || 
|-id=521 bgcolor=#E9E9E9
| 55521 ||  || — || November 10, 2001 || Socorro || LINEAR || — || align=right | 6.2 km || 
|-id=522 bgcolor=#d6d6d6
| 55522 ||  || — || November 10, 2001 || Socorro || LINEAR || — || align=right | 6.9 km || 
|-id=523 bgcolor=#d6d6d6
| 55523 ||  || — || November 10, 2001 || Socorro || LINEAR || — || align=right | 6.8 km || 
|-id=524 bgcolor=#fefefe
| 55524 ||  || — || November 10, 2001 || Socorro || LINEAR || — || align=right | 7.1 km || 
|-id=525 bgcolor=#d6d6d6
| 55525 ||  || — || November 10, 2001 || Socorro || LINEAR || EOS || align=right | 4.0 km || 
|-id=526 bgcolor=#d6d6d6
| 55526 ||  || — || November 10, 2001 || Socorro || LINEAR || — || align=right | 4.8 km || 
|-id=527 bgcolor=#d6d6d6
| 55527 ||  || — || November 10, 2001 || Socorro || LINEAR || — || align=right | 6.0 km || 
|-id=528 bgcolor=#E9E9E9
| 55528 ||  || — || November 8, 2001 || Palomar || NEAT || — || align=right | 5.9 km || 
|-id=529 bgcolor=#d6d6d6
| 55529 ||  || — || November 12, 2001 || Haleakala || NEAT || — || align=right | 7.1 km || 
|-id=530 bgcolor=#d6d6d6
| 55530 ||  || — || November 15, 2001 || Socorro || LINEAR || — || align=right | 9.8 km || 
|-id=531 bgcolor=#d6d6d6
| 55531 ||  || — || November 15, 2001 || Palomar || NEAT || EOS || align=right | 5.2 km || 
|-id=532 bgcolor=#FFC2E0
| 55532 ||  || — || November 18, 2001 || Socorro || LINEAR || APO +1km || align=right | 1.3 km || 
|-id=533 bgcolor=#d6d6d6
| 55533 ||  || — || November 17, 2001 || Socorro || LINEAR || HYG || align=right | 6.4 km || 
|-id=534 bgcolor=#d6d6d6
| 55534 ||  || — || November 17, 2001 || Kitt Peak || Spacewatch || THM || align=right | 5.1 km || 
|-id=535 bgcolor=#E9E9E9
| 55535 ||  || — || November 17, 2001 || Socorro || LINEAR || — || align=right | 4.1 km || 
|-id=536 bgcolor=#E9E9E9
| 55536 ||  || — || November 17, 2001 || Socorro || LINEAR || GEF || align=right | 3.0 km || 
|-id=537 bgcolor=#d6d6d6
| 55537 ||  || — || November 17, 2001 || Socorro || LINEAR || EOS || align=right | 4.3 km || 
|-id=538 bgcolor=#E9E9E9
| 55538 ||  || — || November 17, 2001 || Socorro || LINEAR || — || align=right | 10 km || 
|-id=539 bgcolor=#E9E9E9
| 55539 ||  || — || November 18, 2001 || Socorro || LINEAR || — || align=right | 7.5 km || 
|-id=540 bgcolor=#d6d6d6
| 55540 ||  || — || November 19, 2001 || Socorro || LINEAR || — || align=right | 6.7 km || 
|-id=541 bgcolor=#E9E9E9
| 55541 ||  || — || November 19, 2001 || Anderson Mesa || LONEOS || RAF || align=right | 2.4 km || 
|-id=542 bgcolor=#fefefe
| 55542 ||  || — || December 7, 2001 || Socorro || LINEAR || — || align=right | 2.8 km || 
|-id=543 bgcolor=#E9E9E9
| 55543 Nemeghaire ||  ||  || December 8, 2001 || Uccle || H. Boffin || EUN || align=right | 4.1 km || 
|-id=544 bgcolor=#E9E9E9
| 55544 ||  || — || December 10, 2001 || Socorro || LINEAR || — || align=right | 3.0 km || 
|-id=545 bgcolor=#E9E9E9
| 55545 ||  || — || December 9, 2001 || Socorro || LINEAR || — || align=right | 4.7 km || 
|-id=546 bgcolor=#E9E9E9
| 55546 ||  || — || December 10, 2001 || Socorro || LINEAR || — || align=right | 5.1 km || 
|-id=547 bgcolor=#d6d6d6
| 55547 ||  || — || December 10, 2001 || Socorro || LINEAR || — || align=right | 6.0 km || 
|-id=548 bgcolor=#fefefe
| 55548 ||  || — || December 10, 2001 || Socorro || LINEAR || EUT || align=right | 2.1 km || 
|-id=549 bgcolor=#fefefe
| 55549 ||  || — || December 10, 2001 || Socorro || LINEAR || — || align=right | 3.0 km || 
|-id=550 bgcolor=#E9E9E9
| 55550 ||  || — || December 11, 2001 || Socorro || LINEAR || EUN || align=right | 2.9 km || 
|-id=551 bgcolor=#d6d6d6
| 55551 ||  || — || December 10, 2001 || Socorro || LINEAR || — || align=right | 7.1 km || 
|-id=552 bgcolor=#d6d6d6
| 55552 ||  || — || December 10, 2001 || Socorro || LINEAR || — || align=right | 6.6 km || 
|-id=553 bgcolor=#d6d6d6
| 55553 ||  || — || December 7, 2001 || Socorro || LINEAR || — || align=right | 5.2 km || 
|-id=554 bgcolor=#E9E9E9
| 55554 ||  || — || December 7, 2001 || Palomar || NEAT || EUN || align=right | 4.0 km || 
|-id=555 bgcolor=#E9E9E9
| 55555 DNA ||  ||  || December 19, 2001 || Fountain Hills || C. W. Juels, P. R. Holvorcem || — || align=right | 5.5 km || 
|-id=556 bgcolor=#d6d6d6
| 55556 ||  || — || December 18, 2001 || Socorro || LINEAR || — || align=right | 8.3 km || 
|-id=557 bgcolor=#fefefe
| 55557 ||  || — || December 18, 2001 || Socorro || LINEAR || V || align=right | 2.1 km || 
|-id=558 bgcolor=#d6d6d6
| 55558 ||  || — || December 17, 2001 || Socorro || LINEAR || — || align=right | 9.8 km || 
|-id=559 bgcolor=#d6d6d6
| 55559 Briancraine ||  ||  || December 18, 2001 || Goodricke-Pigott || R. A. Tucker || — || align=right | 5.8 km || 
|-id=560 bgcolor=#d6d6d6
| 55560 ||  || — || December 22, 2001 || Socorro || LINEAR || URS || align=right | 8.0 km || 
|-id=561 bgcolor=#fefefe
| 55561 Madenberg ||  ||  || January 9, 2002 || Desert Moon || B. L. Stevens || — || align=right | 1.7 km || 
|-id=562 bgcolor=#E9E9E9
| 55562 ||  || — || January 8, 2002 || Socorro || LINEAR || — || align=right | 4.9 km || 
|-id=563 bgcolor=#C2FFFF
| 55563 ||  || — || January 12, 2002 || Haleakala || NEAT || L4 || align=right | 27 km || 
|-id=564 bgcolor=#d6d6d6
| 55564 ||  || — || January 10, 2002 || Palomar || NEAT || — || align=right | 10 km || 
|-id=565 bgcolor=#C2E0FF
| 55565 ||  || — || January 10, 2002 || Palomar || Palomar Obs. || other TNO || align=right | 884 km || 
|-id=566 bgcolor=#E9E9E9
| 55566 ||  || — || January 26, 2002 || Socorro || LINEAR || HNS || align=right | 6.5 km || 
|-id=567 bgcolor=#fefefe
| 55567 ||  || — || February 1, 2002 || Socorro || LINEAR || PHO || align=right | 4.2 km || 
|-id=568 bgcolor=#C2FFFF
| 55568 ||  || — || February 8, 2002 || Fountain Hills || C. W. Juels, P. R. Holvorcem || L4 || align=right | 28 km || 
|-id=569 bgcolor=#E9E9E9
| 55569 ||  || — || February 6, 2002 || Socorro || LINEAR || CLO || align=right | 5.8 km || 
|-id=570 bgcolor=#fefefe
| 55570 ||  || — || February 7, 2002 || Socorro || LINEAR || — || align=right | 1.8 km || 
|-id=571 bgcolor=#C2FFFF
| 55571 ||  || — || February 7, 2002 || Socorro || LINEAR || L4 || align=right | 14 km || 
|-id=572 bgcolor=#E9E9E9
| 55572 ||  || — || February 8, 2002 || Socorro || LINEAR || — || align=right | 4.1 km || 
|-id=573 bgcolor=#fefefe
| 55573 ||  || — || February 8, 2002 || Socorro || LINEAR || FLO || align=right | 1.8 km || 
|-id=574 bgcolor=#C2FFFF
| 55574 ||  || — || February 13, 2002 || Socorro || LINEAR || L4 || align=right | 19 km || 
|-id=575 bgcolor=#d6d6d6
| 55575 ||  || — || February 16, 2002 || Haleakala || NEAT || — || align=right | 9.7 km || 
|-id=576 bgcolor=#C7FF8F
| 55576 Amycus ||  ||  || April 8, 2002 || Palomar || NEAT || centaur || align=right | 101 km || 
|-id=577 bgcolor=#fefefe
| 55577 ||  || — || April 9, 2002 || Socorro || LINEAR || — || align=right | 1.9 km || 
|-id=578 bgcolor=#C2FFFF
| 55578 ||  || — || April 11, 2002 || Anderson Mesa || LONEOS || L4 || align=right | 22 km || 
|-id=579 bgcolor=#fefefe
| 55579 ||  || — || May 9, 2002 || Socorro || LINEAR || — || align=right | 2.3 km || 
|-id=580 bgcolor=#E9E9E9
| 55580 ||  || — || May 11, 2002 || Socorro || LINEAR || — || align=right | 9.1 km || 
|-id=581 bgcolor=#fefefe
| 55581 || 2002 NH || — || July 1, 2002 || Palomar || NEAT || — || align=right | 1.6 km || 
|-id=582 bgcolor=#E9E9E9
| 55582 ||  || — || August 5, 2002 || Socorro || LINEAR || DOR || align=right | 7.2 km || 
|-id=583 bgcolor=#fefefe
| 55583 ||  || — || August 5, 2002 || Socorro || LINEAR || — || align=right | 2.4 km || 
|-id=584 bgcolor=#fefefe
| 55584 ||  || — || August 5, 2002 || Socorro || LINEAR || — || align=right | 6.6 km || 
|-id=585 bgcolor=#fefefe
| 55585 ||  || — || August 5, 2002 || Socorro || LINEAR || FLO || align=right | 1.6 km || 
|-id=586 bgcolor=#E9E9E9
| 55586 ||  || — || August 10, 2002 || Socorro || LINEAR || — || align=right | 3.4 km || 
|-id=587 bgcolor=#fefefe
| 55587 ||  || — || August 10, 2002 || Socorro || LINEAR || V || align=right | 2.5 km || 
|-id=588 bgcolor=#E9E9E9
| 55588 ||  || — || August 9, 2002 || Socorro || LINEAR || — || align=right | 6.9 km || 
|-id=589 bgcolor=#fefefe
| 55589 ||  || — || August 14, 2002 || Palomar || NEAT || PHO || align=right | 2.6 km || 
|-id=590 bgcolor=#fefefe
| 55590 ||  || — || August 14, 2002 || Socorro || LINEAR || — || align=right | 2.4 km || 
|-id=591 bgcolor=#d6d6d6
| 55591 ||  || — || August 13, 2002 || Socorro || LINEAR || EOS || align=right | 6.2 km || 
|-id=592 bgcolor=#E9E9E9
| 55592 ||  || — || August 14, 2002 || Socorro || LINEAR || — || align=right | 7.4 km || 
|-id=593 bgcolor=#E9E9E9
| 55593 ||  || — || September 4, 2002 || Anderson Mesa || LONEOS || — || align=right | 4.2 km || 
|-id=594 bgcolor=#E9E9E9
| 55594 ||  || — || September 5, 2002 || Socorro || LINEAR || — || align=right | 3.5 km || 
|-id=595 bgcolor=#fefefe
| 55595 ||  || — || September 5, 2002 || Socorro || LINEAR || — || align=right | 1.7 km || 
|-id=596 bgcolor=#E9E9E9
| 55596 ||  || — || September 5, 2002 || Socorro || LINEAR || — || align=right | 4.3 km || 
|-id=597 bgcolor=#fefefe
| 55597 ||  || — || September 7, 2002 || Ametlla de Mar || J. Nomen || V || align=right | 1.7 km || 
|-id=598 bgcolor=#d6d6d6
| 55598 ||  || — || September 5, 2002 || Socorro || LINEAR || — || align=right | 6.1 km || 
|-id=599 bgcolor=#E9E9E9
| 55599 ||  || — || September 5, 2002 || Socorro || LINEAR || — || align=right | 4.3 km || 
|-id=600 bgcolor=#E9E9E9
| 55600 ||  || — || September 5, 2002 || Socorro || LINEAR || EUN || align=right | 3.7 km || 
|}

55601–55700 

|-bgcolor=#d6d6d6
| 55601 ||  || — || September 6, 2002 || Socorro || LINEAR || — || align=right | 5.8 km || 
|-id=602 bgcolor=#d6d6d6
| 55602 ||  || — || September 7, 2002 || Socorro || LINEAR || — || align=right | 8.0 km || 
|-id=603 bgcolor=#E9E9E9
| 55603 ||  || — || September 7, 2002 || Ondřejov || P. Kušnirák, P. Pravec || — || align=right | 3.3 km || 
|-id=604 bgcolor=#E9E9E9
| 55604 ||  || — || September 10, 2002 || Palomar || NEAT || — || align=right | 6.2 km || 
|-id=605 bgcolor=#fefefe
| 55605 ||  || — || September 10, 2002 || Palomar || NEAT || — || align=right | 3.2 km || 
|-id=606 bgcolor=#fefefe
| 55606 ||  || — || September 10, 2002 || Haleakala || NEAT || — || align=right | 4.3 km || 
|-id=607 bgcolor=#d6d6d6
| 55607 ||  || — || September 11, 2002 || Palomar || NEAT || — || align=right | 14 km || 
|-id=608 bgcolor=#d6d6d6
| 55608 ||  || — || September 26, 2002 || Palomar || NEAT || — || align=right | 8.8 km || 
|-id=609 bgcolor=#fefefe
| 55609 ||  || — || September 27, 2002 || Palomar || NEAT || — || align=right | 2.1 km || 
|-id=610 bgcolor=#E9E9E9
| 55610 ||  || — || September 30, 2002 || Haleakala || NEAT || — || align=right | 5.4 km || 
|-id=611 bgcolor=#d6d6d6
| 55611 ||  || — || September 30, 2002 || Haleakala || NEAT || EOS || align=right | 4.8 km || 
|-id=612 bgcolor=#fefefe
| 55612 ||  || — || October 2, 2002 || Socorro || LINEAR || — || align=right | 2.0 km || 
|-id=613 bgcolor=#d6d6d6
| 55613 ||  || — || October 2, 2002 || Socorro || LINEAR || — || align=right | 6.7 km || 
|-id=614 bgcolor=#d6d6d6
| 55614 ||  || — || October 4, 2002 || Ametlla de Mar || J. Nomen || EMA || align=right | 11 km || 
|-id=615 bgcolor=#E9E9E9
| 55615 ||  || — || October 4, 2002 || Socorro || LINEAR || — || align=right | 4.9 km || 
|-id=616 bgcolor=#d6d6d6
| 55616 ||  || — || October 1, 2002 || Anderson Mesa || LONEOS || — || align=right | 6.9 km || 
|-id=617 bgcolor=#d6d6d6
| 55617 ||  || — || October 1, 2002 || Socorro || LINEAR || — || align=right | 5.9 km || 
|-id=618 bgcolor=#fefefe
| 55618 ||  || — || October 1, 2002 || Socorro || LINEAR || — || align=right | 2.3 km || 
|-id=619 bgcolor=#E9E9E9
| 55619 ||  || — || October 1, 2002 || Socorro || LINEAR || — || align=right | 8.0 km || 
|-id=620 bgcolor=#E9E9E9
| 55620 ||  || — || October 3, 2002 || Palomar || NEAT || — || align=right | 2.2 km || 
|-id=621 bgcolor=#d6d6d6
| 55621 ||  || — || October 4, 2002 || Anderson Mesa || LONEOS || EOS || align=right | 6.9 km || 
|-id=622 bgcolor=#d6d6d6
| 55622 ||  || — || October 4, 2002 || Socorro || LINEAR || — || align=right | 4.8 km || 
|-id=623 bgcolor=#E9E9E9
| 55623 ||  || — || October 5, 2002 || Palomar || NEAT || — || align=right | 4.6 km || 
|-id=624 bgcolor=#E9E9E9
| 55624 ||  || — || October 3, 2002 || Socorro || LINEAR || — || align=right | 3.9 km || 
|-id=625 bgcolor=#E9E9E9
| 55625 ||  || — || October 3, 2002 || Socorro || LINEAR || MAR || align=right | 4.5 km || 
|-id=626 bgcolor=#fefefe
| 55626 ||  || — || October 4, 2002 || Socorro || LINEAR || — || align=right | 2.0 km || 
|-id=627 bgcolor=#d6d6d6
| 55627 ||  || — || October 6, 2002 || Socorro || LINEAR || — || align=right | 9.8 km || 
|-id=628 bgcolor=#fefefe
| 55628 ||  || — || October 7, 2002 || Socorro || LINEAR || NYS || align=right | 1.9 km || 
|-id=629 bgcolor=#E9E9E9
| 55629 ||  || — || October 7, 2002 || Haleakala || NEAT || — || align=right | 3.8 km || 
|-id=630 bgcolor=#E9E9E9
| 55630 ||  || — || October 9, 2002 || Socorro || LINEAR || MAR || align=right | 3.6 km || 
|-id=631 bgcolor=#fefefe
| 55631 ||  || — || October 10, 2002 || Socorro || LINEAR || V || align=right | 4.6 km || 
|-id=632 bgcolor=#E9E9E9
| 55632 ||  || — || October 10, 2002 || Socorro || LINEAR || — || align=right | 4.0 km || 
|-id=633 bgcolor=#fefefe
| 55633 ||  || — || October 10, 2002 || Socorro || LINEAR || V || align=right | 2.0 km || 
|-id=634 bgcolor=#fefefe
| 55634 ||  || — || October 10, 2002 || Socorro || LINEAR || — || align=right | 2.3 km || 
|-id=635 bgcolor=#fefefe
| 55635 ||  || — || October 10, 2002 || Socorro || LINEAR || — || align=right | 4.3 km || 
|-id=636 bgcolor=#C2E0FF
| 55636 ||  || — || October 15, 2002 || Palomar || NEAT || Haumea || align=right | 860 km || 
|-id=637 bgcolor=#C2E0FF
| 55637 ||  || — || October 30, 2002 || Kitt Peak || Spacewatch || other TNOmoon || align=right | 742 km || 
|-id=638 bgcolor=#C2E0FF
| 55638 ||  || — || November 14, 2002 || Palomar || NEAT || plutino || align=right | 386 km || 
|-id=639 bgcolor=#E9E9E9
| 55639 || 2070 P-L || — || September 24, 1960 || Palomar || PLS || PAD || align=right | 6.1 km || 
|-id=640 bgcolor=#fefefe
| 55640 || 2114 P-L || — || September 24, 1960 || Palomar || PLS || — || align=right | 2.3 km || 
|-id=641 bgcolor=#fefefe
| 55641 || 2125 P-L || — || September 24, 1960 || Palomar || PLS || — || align=right | 2.3 km || 
|-id=642 bgcolor=#E9E9E9
| 55642 || 2138 P-L || — || September 24, 1960 || Palomar || PLS || — || align=right | 2.3 km || 
|-id=643 bgcolor=#E9E9E9
| 55643 || 2179 P-L || — || September 24, 1960 || Palomar || PLS || — || align=right | 6.6 km || 
|-id=644 bgcolor=#fefefe
| 55644 || 2582 P-L || — || September 24, 1960 || Palomar || PLS || — || align=right | 3.8 km || 
|-id=645 bgcolor=#E9E9E9
| 55645 || 2625 P-L || — || September 24, 1960 || Palomar || PLS || — || align=right | 2.0 km || 
|-id=646 bgcolor=#E9E9E9
| 55646 || 2637 P-L || — || September 24, 1960 || Palomar || PLS || — || align=right | 2.8 km || 
|-id=647 bgcolor=#E9E9E9
| 55647 || 2676 P-L || — || September 24, 1960 || Palomar || PLS || — || align=right | 2.1 km || 
|-id=648 bgcolor=#E9E9E9
| 55648 || 2786 P-L || — || September 26, 1960 || Palomar || PLS || EUN || align=right | 2.8 km || 
|-id=649 bgcolor=#E9E9E9
| 55649 || 3023 P-L || — || September 24, 1960 || Palomar || PLS || — || align=right | 4.2 km || 
|-id=650 bgcolor=#fefefe
| 55650 || 3536 P-L || — || October 17, 1960 || Palomar || PLS || — || align=right | 2.8 km || 
|-id=651 bgcolor=#d6d6d6
| 55651 || 4043 P-L || — || September 24, 1960 || Palomar || PLS || EOS || align=right | 4.5 km || 
|-id=652 bgcolor=#d6d6d6
| 55652 || 4048 P-L || — || September 24, 1960 || Palomar || PLS || — || align=right | 8.0 km || 
|-id=653 bgcolor=#E9E9E9
| 55653 || 4088 P-L || — || September 24, 1960 || Palomar || PLS || — || align=right | 2.5 km || 
|-id=654 bgcolor=#fefefe
| 55654 || 4093 P-L || — || September 24, 1960 || Palomar || PLS || — || align=right | 5.3 km || 
|-id=655 bgcolor=#fefefe
| 55655 || 4101 P-L || — || September 24, 1960 || Palomar || PLS || — || align=right | 5.9 km || 
|-id=656 bgcolor=#fefefe
| 55656 || 4708 P-L || — || September 24, 1960 || Palomar || PLS || — || align=right | 2.0 km || 
|-id=657 bgcolor=#fefefe
| 55657 || 4905 P-L || — || September 24, 1960 || Palomar || PLS || NYS || align=right | 1.4 km || 
|-id=658 bgcolor=#fefefe
| 55658 || 6061 P-L || — || September 24, 1960 || Palomar || PLS || NYS || align=right | 2.0 km || 
|-id=659 bgcolor=#fefefe
| 55659 || 6110 P-L || — || September 24, 1960 || Palomar || PLS || FLO || align=right | 1.9 km || 
|-id=660 bgcolor=#E9E9E9
| 55660 || 6119 P-L || — || September 24, 1960 || Palomar || PLS || — || align=right | 1.8 km || 
|-id=661 bgcolor=#fefefe
| 55661 || 6184 P-L || — || September 24, 1960 || Palomar || PLS || V || align=right | 1.3 km || 
|-id=662 bgcolor=#E9E9E9
| 55662 || 6224 P-L || — || September 24, 1960 || Palomar || PLS || — || align=right | 3.7 km || 
|-id=663 bgcolor=#fefefe
| 55663 || 6247 P-L || — || September 24, 1960 || Palomar || PLS || — || align=right | 1.9 km || 
|-id=664 bgcolor=#fefefe
| 55664 || 6281 P-L || — || September 24, 1960 || Palomar || PLS || MAS || align=right | 1.5 km || 
|-id=665 bgcolor=#fefefe
| 55665 || 6527 P-L || — || September 24, 1960 || Palomar || PLS || MAS || align=right | 2.0 km || 
|-id=666 bgcolor=#fefefe
| 55666 || 6631 P-L || — || September 24, 1960 || Palomar || PLS || FLO || align=right | 1.5 km || 
|-id=667 bgcolor=#fefefe
| 55667 || 6691 P-L || — || September 24, 1960 || Palomar || PLS || — || align=right | 2.7 km || 
|-id=668 bgcolor=#fefefe
| 55668 || 6722 P-L || — || September 24, 1960 || Palomar || PLS || — || align=right | 2.0 km || 
|-id=669 bgcolor=#fefefe
| 55669 || 6810 P-L || — || September 24, 1960 || Palomar || PLS || — || align=right | 1.5 km || 
|-id=670 bgcolor=#E9E9E9
| 55670 || 9581 P-L || — || October 17, 1960 || Palomar || PLS || — || align=right | 5.4 km || 
|-id=671 bgcolor=#E9E9E9
| 55671 || 9587 P-L || — || October 17, 1960 || Palomar || PLS || HOF || align=right | 6.4 km || 
|-id=672 bgcolor=#fefefe
| 55672 || 1049 T-1 || — || March 25, 1971 || Palomar || PLS || — || align=right | 3.4 km || 
|-id=673 bgcolor=#E9E9E9
| 55673 || 1150 T-1 || — || March 25, 1971 || Palomar || PLS || — || align=right | 2.4 km || 
|-id=674 bgcolor=#fefefe
| 55674 || 2112 T-1 || — || March 25, 1971 || Palomar || PLS || V || align=right | 1.5 km || 
|-id=675 bgcolor=#fefefe
| 55675 || 2316 T-1 || — || March 25, 1971 || Palomar || PLS || NYS || align=right | 1.9 km || 
|-id=676 bgcolor=#C2FFFF
| 55676 Klythios || 3034 T-1 ||  || March 26, 1971 || Palomar || PLS || L5 || align=right | 13 km || 
|-id=677 bgcolor=#E9E9E9
| 55677 || 3201 T-1 || — || March 26, 1971 || Palomar || PLS || DOR || align=right | 8.8 km || 
|-id=678 bgcolor=#C2FFFF
| 55678 Lampos || 3291 T-1 ||  || March 26, 1971 || Palomar || PLS || L5 || align=right | 18 km || 
|-id=679 bgcolor=#fefefe
| 55679 || 4230 T-1 || — || March 26, 1971 || Palomar || PLS || NYS || align=right | 1.5 km || 
|-id=680 bgcolor=#E9E9E9
| 55680 || 4289 T-1 || — || March 26, 1971 || Palomar || PLS || — || align=right | 2.7 km || 
|-id=681 bgcolor=#fefefe
| 55681 || 1143 T-2 || — || September 29, 1973 || Palomar || PLS || — || align=right | 1.5 km || 
|-id=682 bgcolor=#d6d6d6
| 55682 || 1303 T-2 || — || September 29, 1973 || Palomar || PLS || HYG || align=right | 6.8 km || 
|-id=683 bgcolor=#E9E9E9
| 55683 || 1361 T-2 || — || September 29, 1973 || Palomar || PLS || — || align=right | 3.5 km || 
|-id=684 bgcolor=#d6d6d6
| 55684 || 1510 T-2 || — || September 30, 1973 || Palomar || PLS || — || align=right | 5.6 km || 
|-id=685 bgcolor=#E9E9E9
| 55685 || 2030 T-2 || — || September 29, 1973 || Palomar || PLS || — || align=right | 2.0 km || 
|-id=686 bgcolor=#fefefe
| 55686 || 2041 T-2 || — || September 29, 1973 || Palomar || PLS || — || align=right | 1.8 km || 
|-id=687 bgcolor=#fefefe
| 55687 || 2049 T-2 || — || September 29, 1973 || Palomar || PLS || NYS || align=right | 1.9 km || 
|-id=688 bgcolor=#E9E9E9
| 55688 || 2053 T-2 || — || September 29, 1973 || Palomar || PLS || DOR || align=right | 6.5 km || 
|-id=689 bgcolor=#E9E9E9
| 55689 || 2237 T-2 || — || September 29, 1973 || Palomar || PLS || — || align=right | 2.8 km || 
|-id=690 bgcolor=#d6d6d6
| 55690 || 2696 T-2 || — || September 29, 1973 || Palomar || PLS || — || align=right | 4.2 km || 
|-id=691 bgcolor=#d6d6d6
| 55691 || 3028 T-2 || — || September 30, 1973 || Palomar || PLS || KOR || align=right | 3.3 km || 
|-id=692 bgcolor=#fefefe
| 55692 || 3118 T-2 || — || September 30, 1973 || Palomar || PLS || — || align=right | 2.2 km || 
|-id=693 bgcolor=#fefefe
| 55693 || 4149 T-2 || — || September 29, 1973 || Palomar || PLS || — || align=right | 1.8 km || 
|-id=694 bgcolor=#E9E9E9
| 55694 || 4199 T-2 || — || September 29, 1973 || Palomar || PLS || — || align=right | 2.2 km || 
|-id=695 bgcolor=#fefefe
| 55695 || 4225 T-2 || — || September 29, 1973 || Palomar || PLS || — || align=right | 2.0 km || 
|-id=696 bgcolor=#d6d6d6
| 55696 || 4227 T-2 || — || September 29, 1973 || Palomar || PLS || HYG || align=right | 7.4 km || 
|-id=697 bgcolor=#E9E9E9
| 55697 || 4233 T-2 || — || September 29, 1973 || Palomar || PLS || — || align=right | 1.6 km || 
|-id=698 bgcolor=#d6d6d6
| 55698 || 4301 T-2 || — || September 29, 1973 || Palomar || PLS || HYG || align=right | 5.5 km || 
|-id=699 bgcolor=#E9E9E9
| 55699 || 5396 T-2 || — || September 30, 1973 || Palomar || PLS || EUN || align=right | 3.1 km || 
|-id=700 bgcolor=#fefefe
| 55700 || 1092 T-3 || — || October 17, 1977 || Palomar || PLS || V || align=right | 1.3 km || 
|}

55701–55800 

|-bgcolor=#C2FFFF
| 55701 Ukalegon || 1193 T-3 ||  || October 17, 1977 || Palomar || PLS || L5 || align=right | 17 km || 
|-id=702 bgcolor=#C2FFFF
| 55702 Thymoitos || 1302 T-3 ||  || October 17, 1977 || Palomar || PLS || L5 || align=right | 20 km || 
|-id=703 bgcolor=#d6d6d6
| 55703 || 2032 T-3 || — || October 16, 1977 || Palomar || PLS || CHA || align=right | 5.9 km || 
|-id=704 bgcolor=#d6d6d6
| 55704 || 2165 T-3 || — || October 16, 1977 || Palomar || PLS || 628 || align=right | 4.5 km || 
|-id=705 bgcolor=#fefefe
| 55705 || 2190 T-3 || — || October 16, 1977 || Palomar || PLS || FLO || align=right | 2.0 km || 
|-id=706 bgcolor=#E9E9E9
| 55706 || 2241 T-3 || — || October 16, 1977 || Palomar || PLS || — || align=right | 2.0 km || 
|-id=707 bgcolor=#fefefe
| 55707 || 2246 T-3 || — || October 16, 1977 || Palomar || PLS || — || align=right | 3.4 km || 
|-id=708 bgcolor=#fefefe
| 55708 || 2288 T-3 || — || October 16, 1977 || Palomar || PLS || FLO || align=right | 2.6 km || 
|-id=709 bgcolor=#fefefe
| 55709 || 2434 T-3 || — || October 16, 1977 || Palomar || PLS || FLO || align=right | 3.1 km || 
|-id=710 bgcolor=#d6d6d6
| 55710 || 3081 T-3 || — || October 16, 1977 || Palomar || PLS || KOR || align=right | 3.1 km || 
|-id=711 bgcolor=#E9E9E9
| 55711 || 3122 T-3 || — || October 16, 1977 || Palomar || PLS || — || align=right | 2.2 km || 
|-id=712 bgcolor=#d6d6d6
| 55712 || 3174 T-3 || — || October 16, 1977 || Palomar || PLS || KOR || align=right | 2.7 km || 
|-id=713 bgcolor=#fefefe
| 55713 || 3463 T-3 || — || October 16, 1977 || Palomar || PLS || FLO || align=right | 2.0 km || 
|-id=714 bgcolor=#fefefe
| 55714 || 3491 T-3 || — || October 16, 1977 || Palomar || PLS || — || align=right | 1.7 km || 
|-id=715 bgcolor=#E9E9E9
| 55715 || 3536 T-3 || — || October 16, 1977 || Palomar || PLS || — || align=right | 1.7 km || 
|-id=716 bgcolor=#E9E9E9
| 55716 || 4249 T-3 || — || October 16, 1977 || Palomar || PLS || — || align=right | 2.6 km || 
|-id=717 bgcolor=#fefefe
| 55717 || 5027 T-3 || — || October 16, 1977 || Palomar || PLS || FLO || align=right | 1.5 km || 
|-id=718 bgcolor=#fefefe
| 55718 || 5096 T-3 || — || October 16, 1977 || Palomar || PLS || V || align=right | 1.5 km || 
|-id=719 bgcolor=#fefefe
| 55719 || 5131 T-3 || — || October 16, 1977 || Palomar || PLS || V || align=right | 1.8 km || 
|-id=720 bgcolor=#fefefe
| 55720 Daandehoop || 1972 RE ||  || September 15, 1972 || Palomar || T. Gehrels || H || align=right | 1.6 km || 
|-id=721 bgcolor=#fefefe
| 55721 ||  || — || October 27, 1978 || Palomar || C. M. Olmstead || — || align=right | 2.9 km || 
|-id=722 bgcolor=#E9E9E9
| 55722 ||  || — || November 7, 1978 || Palomar || E. F. Helin, S. J. Bus || — || align=right | 3.9 km || 
|-id=723 bgcolor=#d6d6d6
| 55723 ||  || — || June 25, 1979 || Siding Spring || E. F. Helin, S. J. Bus || EOS || align=right | 4.7 km || 
|-id=724 bgcolor=#E9E9E9
| 55724 ||  || — || June 25, 1979 || Siding Spring || E. F. Helin, S. J. Bus || — || align=right | 4.4 km || 
|-id=725 bgcolor=#fefefe
| 55725 ||  || — || June 25, 1979 || Siding Spring || E. F. Helin, S. J. Bus || — || align=right | 2.6 km || 
|-id=726 bgcolor=#d6d6d6
| 55726 ||  || — || June 25, 1979 || Siding Spring || E. F. Helin, S. J. Bus || — || align=right | 8.4 km || 
|-id=727 bgcolor=#fefefe
| 55727 ||  || — || March 2, 1981 || Siding Spring || S. J. Bus || — || align=right | 2.4 km || 
|-id=728 bgcolor=#fefefe
| 55728 ||  || — || March 2, 1981 || Siding Spring || S. J. Bus || NYS || align=right | 1.7 km || 
|-id=729 bgcolor=#E9E9E9
| 55729 ||  || — || March 2, 1981 || Siding Spring || S. J. Bus || — || align=right | 6.3 km || 
|-id=730 bgcolor=#E9E9E9
| 55730 ||  || — || March 1, 1981 || Siding Spring || S. J. Bus || — || align=right | 6.9 km || 
|-id=731 bgcolor=#fefefe
| 55731 ||  || — || March 1, 1981 || Siding Spring || S. J. Bus || — || align=right | 2.6 km || 
|-id=732 bgcolor=#E9E9E9
| 55732 ||  || — || August 28, 1986 || La Silla || H. Debehogne || — || align=right | 7.0 km || 
|-id=733 bgcolor=#d6d6d6
| 55733 Lepsius ||  ||  || November 27, 1986 || Tautenburg Observatory || F. Börngen || — || align=right | 5.0 km || 
|-id=734 bgcolor=#E9E9E9
| 55734 ||  || — || November 27, 1986 || Caussols || CERGA || — || align=right | 3.8 km || 
|-id=735 bgcolor=#E9E9E9
| 55735 Magdeburg || 1987 QV ||  || August 22, 1987 || Tautenburg Observatory || F. Börngen || MIT || align=right | 8.1 km || 
|-id=736 bgcolor=#E9E9E9
| 55736 ||  || — || August 21, 1987 || Kleť || Z. Vávrová || — || align=right | 12 km || 
|-id=737 bgcolor=#fefefe
| 55737 Coquimbo ||  ||  || February 11, 1988 || La Silla || E. W. Elst || — || align=right | 3.2 km || 
|-id=738 bgcolor=#fefefe
| 55738 ||  || — || November 14, 1988 || Kushiro || S. Ueda, H. Kaneda || — || align=right | 4.8 km || 
|-id=739 bgcolor=#E9E9E9
| 55739 || 1989 TV || — || October 4, 1989 || Palomar || E. F. Helin || — || align=right | 3.1 km || 
|-id=740 bgcolor=#d6d6d6
| 55740 ||  || — || December 30, 1989 || Siding Spring || R. H. McNaught || 7:4 || align=right | 8.6 km || 
|-id=741 bgcolor=#fefefe
| 55741 ||  || — || August 22, 1990 || Palomar || H. E. Holt || — || align=right | 2.5 km || 
|-id=742 bgcolor=#fefefe
| 55742 ||  || — || August 16, 1990 || La Silla || E. W. Elst || V || align=right | 2.1 km || 
|-id=743 bgcolor=#d6d6d6
| 55743 ||  || — || September 9, 1990 || La Silla || H. Debehogne || — || align=right | 7.7 km || 
|-id=744 bgcolor=#fefefe
| 55744 ||  || — || September 13, 1990 || La Silla || H. Debehogne || — || align=right | 5.6 km || 
|-id=745 bgcolor=#fefefe
| 55745 ||  || — || September 22, 1990 || La Silla || E. W. Elst || — || align=right | 2.1 km || 
|-id=746 bgcolor=#fefefe
| 55746 ||  || — || September 22, 1990 || La Silla || E. W. Elst || FLO || align=right | 2.6 km || 
|-id=747 bgcolor=#fefefe
| 55747 ||  || — || September 25, 1990 || La Silla || H. Debehogne || H || align=right | 1.4 km || 
|-id=748 bgcolor=#d6d6d6
| 55748 ||  || — || November 14, 1990 || La Silla || E. W. Elst || — || align=right | 9.9 km || 
|-id=749 bgcolor=#d6d6d6
| 55749 Eulenspiegel ||  ||  || January 15, 1991 || Tautenburg Observatory || F. Börngen || — || align=right | 8.4 km || 
|-id=750 bgcolor=#E9E9E9
| 55750 ||  || — || April 8, 1991 || La Silla || E. W. Elst || — || align=right | 2.6 km || 
|-id=751 bgcolor=#E9E9E9
| 55751 ||  || — || July 8, 1991 || La Silla || H. Debehogne || — || align=right | 8.0 km || 
|-id=752 bgcolor=#E9E9E9
| 55752 ||  || — || August 7, 1991 || Palomar || H. E. Holt || INO || align=right | 3.7 km || 
|-id=753 bgcolor=#E9E9E9
| 55753 Raman ||  ||  || September 13, 1991 || Tautenburg Observatory || F. Börngen, L. D. Schmadel || GEF || align=right | 3.3 km || 
|-id=754 bgcolor=#fefefe
| 55754 ||  || — || September 13, 1991 || Palomar || H. E. Holt || — || align=right | 4.3 km || 
|-id=755 bgcolor=#fefefe
| 55755 Blythe ||  ||  || October 6, 1991 || Palomar || A. Lowe || NYS || align=right | 2.9 km || 
|-id=756 bgcolor=#d6d6d6
| 55756 ||  || — || November 4, 1991 || Kitt Peak || Spacewatch || — || align=right | 7.5 km || 
|-id=757 bgcolor=#FA8072
| 55757 || 1991 XN || — || December 7, 1991 || Palomar || E. F. Helin || — || align=right | 2.4 km || 
|-id=758 bgcolor=#fefefe
| 55758 || 1991 XR || — || December 3, 1991 || Palomar || C. S. Shoemaker || PHO || align=right | 2.9 km || 
|-id=759 bgcolor=#fefefe
| 55759 Erdmannsdorff ||  ||  || December 10, 1991 || Tautenburg Observatory || F. Börngen || — || align=right | 4.9 km || 
|-id=760 bgcolor=#FA8072
| 55760 ||  || — || January 30, 1992 || Palomar || E. F. Helin || — || align=right | 6.5 km || 
|-id=761 bgcolor=#d6d6d6
| 55761 ||  || — || February 2, 1992 || La Silla || E. W. Elst || — || align=right | 8.9 km || 
|-id=762 bgcolor=#fefefe
| 55762 ||  || — || February 2, 1992 || La Silla || E. W. Elst || FLO || align=right | 2.2 km || 
|-id=763 bgcolor=#d6d6d6
| 55763 ||  || — || February 29, 1992 || La Silla || UESAC || — || align=right | 5.7 km || 
|-id=764 bgcolor=#fefefe
| 55764 ||  || — || February 26, 1992 || Kitt Peak || Spacewatch || V || align=right | 1.7 km || 
|-id=765 bgcolor=#fefefe
| 55765 ||  || — || March 1, 1992 || La Silla || UESAC || NYS || align=right | 4.4 km || 
|-id=766 bgcolor=#d6d6d6
| 55766 ||  || — || March 1, 1992 || La Silla || UESAC || — || align=right | 3.9 km || 
|-id=767 bgcolor=#d6d6d6
| 55767 ||  || — || March 6, 1992 || La Silla || UESAC || — || align=right | 5.8 km || 
|-id=768 bgcolor=#fefefe
| 55768 ||  || — || April 4, 1992 || La Silla || E. W. Elst || NYS || align=right | 2.5 km || 
|-id=769 bgcolor=#fefefe
| 55769 ||  || — || April 24, 1992 || La Silla || H. Debehogne || NYS || align=right | 2.3 km || 
|-id=770 bgcolor=#E9E9E9
| 55770 || 1992 OW || — || July 28, 1992 || Siding Spring || R. H. McNaught || JUN || align=right | 3.1 km || 
|-id=771 bgcolor=#E9E9E9
| 55771 ||  || — || August 8, 1992 || Caussols || E. W. Elst || — || align=right | 3.6 km || 
|-id=772 bgcolor=#fefefe
| 55772 Loder ||  ||  || December 30, 1992 || Tautenburg Observatory || F. Börngen || — || align=right | 2.2 km || 
|-id=773 bgcolor=#fefefe
| 55773 ||  || — || January 27, 1993 || Caussols || E. W. Elst || — || align=right | 2.2 km || 
|-id=774 bgcolor=#fefefe
| 55774 ||  || — || March 17, 1993 || La Silla || UESAC || — || align=right | 1.4 km || 
|-id=775 bgcolor=#fefefe
| 55775 ||  || — || March 19, 1993 || La Silla || UESAC || — || align=right | 2.1 km || 
|-id=776 bgcolor=#fefefe
| 55776 ||  || — || March 17, 1993 || La Silla || UESAC || FLO || align=right | 1.7 km || 
|-id=777 bgcolor=#fefefe
| 55777 ||  || — || March 19, 1993 || La Silla || UESAC || — || align=right | 1.7 km || 
|-id=778 bgcolor=#fefefe
| 55778 ||  || — || March 21, 1993 || La Silla || UESAC || — || align=right | 2.1 km || 
|-id=779 bgcolor=#d6d6d6
| 55779 ||  || — || March 21, 1993 || La Silla || UESAC || — || align=right | 5.9 km || 
|-id=780 bgcolor=#fefefe
| 55780 ||  || — || March 19, 1993 || La Silla || UESAC || FLO || align=right | 1.7 km || 
|-id=781 bgcolor=#fefefe
| 55781 ||  || — || March 19, 1993 || La Silla || UESAC || — || align=right | 3.1 km || 
|-id=782 bgcolor=#d6d6d6
| 55782 ||  || — || March 19, 1993 || La Silla || UESAC || EOS || align=right | 3.7 km || 
|-id=783 bgcolor=#fefefe
| 55783 ||  || — || March 19, 1993 || La Silla || UESAC || FLO || align=right | 1.9 km || 
|-id=784 bgcolor=#fefefe
| 55784 ||  || — || March 21, 1993 || La Silla || UESAC || — || align=right | 2.1 km || 
|-id=785 bgcolor=#fefefe
| 55785 ||  || — || March 17, 1993 || La Silla || UESAC || NYS || align=right | 2.1 km || 
|-id=786 bgcolor=#fefefe
| 55786 ||  || — || July 20, 1993 || La Silla || E. W. Elst || V || align=right | 2.6 km || 
|-id=787 bgcolor=#fefefe
| 55787 ||  || — || July 20, 1993 || La Silla || E. W. Elst || — || align=right | 2.3 km || 
|-id=788 bgcolor=#fefefe
| 55788 ||  || — || August 15, 1993 || Caussols || E. W. Elst || — || align=right | 3.0 km || 
|-id=789 bgcolor=#fefefe
| 55789 ||  || — || September 14, 1993 || La Silla || H. Debehogne, E. W. Elst || — || align=right | 2.7 km || 
|-id=790 bgcolor=#fefefe
| 55790 ||  || — || September 15, 1993 || La Silla || H. Debehogne, E. W. Elst || — || align=right | 5.3 km || 
|-id=791 bgcolor=#fefefe
| 55791 ||  || — || September 19, 1993 || Kitami || K. Endate, K. Watanabe || — || align=right | 3.9 km || 
|-id=792 bgcolor=#fefefe
| 55792 ||  || — || September 18, 1993 || Palomar || H. E. Holt || PHO || align=right | 3.3 km || 
|-id=793 bgcolor=#E9E9E9
| 55793 ||  || — || September 19, 1993 || Caussols || E. W. Elst || — || align=right | 2.2 km || 
|-id=794 bgcolor=#E9E9E9
| 55794 ||  || — || October 9, 1993 || La Silla || E. W. Elst || — || align=right | 2.1 km || 
|-id=795 bgcolor=#E9E9E9
| 55795 ||  || — || October 9, 1993 || La Silla || E. W. Elst || — || align=right | 2.7 km || 
|-id=796 bgcolor=#E9E9E9
| 55796 ||  || — || January 12, 1994 || Kitt Peak || Spacewatch || — || align=right | 2.9 km || 
|-id=797 bgcolor=#E9E9E9
| 55797 ||  || — || February 8, 1994 || La Silla || E. W. Elst || — || align=right | 3.4 km || 
|-id=798 bgcolor=#E9E9E9
| 55798 ||  || — || March 9, 1994 || Caussols || E. W. Elst || — || align=right | 3.2 km || 
|-id=799 bgcolor=#E9E9E9
| 55799 ||  || — || March 9, 1994 || Caussols || E. W. Elst || HOF || align=right | 4.7 km || 
|-id=800 bgcolor=#E9E9E9
| 55800 ||  || — || March 9, 1994 || Caussols || E. W. Elst || — || align=right | 3.6 km || 
|}

55801–55900 

|-bgcolor=#fefefe
| 55801 ||  || — || August 10, 1994 || La Silla || E. W. Elst || FLO || align=right | 1.5 km || 
|-id=802 bgcolor=#d6d6d6
| 55802 ||  || — || August 10, 1994 || La Silla || E. W. Elst || — || align=right | 9.9 km || 
|-id=803 bgcolor=#fefefe
| 55803 ||  || — || August 10, 1994 || La Silla || E. W. Elst || — || align=right | 1.8 km || 
|-id=804 bgcolor=#fefefe
| 55804 ||  || — || August 10, 1994 || La Silla || E. W. Elst || — || align=right | 2.0 km || 
|-id=805 bgcolor=#fefefe
| 55805 ||  || — || August 10, 1994 || La Silla || E. W. Elst || FLO || align=right | 1.6 km || 
|-id=806 bgcolor=#d6d6d6
| 55806 ||  || — || August 12, 1994 || La Silla || E. W. Elst || — || align=right | 7.5 km || 
|-id=807 bgcolor=#fefefe
| 55807 ||  || — || August 10, 1994 || La Silla || E. W. Elst || — || align=right | 1.5 km || 
|-id=808 bgcolor=#d6d6d6
| 55808 || 1994 RN || — || September 7, 1994 || Stroncone || Santa Lucia Obs. || VER || align=right | 5.8 km || 
|-id=809 bgcolor=#fefefe
| 55809 ||  || — || September 3, 1994 || La Silla || E. W. Elst || — || align=right | 1.3 km || 
|-id=810 bgcolor=#fefefe
| 55810 Fabiofazio || 1994 TC ||  || October 4, 1994 || Sormano || P. Sicoli, P. Ghezzi || PHO || align=right | 2.7 km || 
|-id=811 bgcolor=#fefefe
| 55811 ||  || — || October 10, 1994 || Kitt Peak || Spacewatch || — || align=right | 1.8 km || 
|-id=812 bgcolor=#fefefe
| 55812 ||  || — || October 28, 1994 || Kitt Peak || Spacewatch || V || align=right | 1.9 km || 
|-id=813 bgcolor=#fefefe
| 55813 ||  || — || November 8, 1994 || Oizumi || T. Kobayashi || NYS || align=right | 4.6 km || 
|-id=814 bgcolor=#fefefe
| 55814 || 1994 YD || — || December 24, 1994 || Oizumi || T. Kobayashi || — || align=right | 3.3 km || 
|-id=815 bgcolor=#fefefe
| 55815 Melindakim ||  ||  || December 31, 1994 || Siding Spring || D. I. Steel || — || align=right | 4.9 km || 
|-id=816 bgcolor=#E9E9E9
| 55816 || 1995 CO || — || February 4, 1995 || Stony Ridge || J. B. Child, J. E. Rogers || — || align=right | 5.3 km || 
|-id=817 bgcolor=#E9E9E9
| 55817 ||  || — || February 24, 1995 || Kitt Peak || Spacewatch || RAF || align=right | 2.6 km || 
|-id=818 bgcolor=#E9E9E9
| 55818 ||  || — || February 25, 1995 || Kitt Peak || Spacewatch || — || align=right | 2.6 km || 
|-id=819 bgcolor=#E9E9E9
| 55819 ||  || — || March 2, 1995 || Kitt Peak || Spacewatch || — || align=right | 4.3 km || 
|-id=820 bgcolor=#fefefe
| 55820 || 1995 FW || — || March 25, 1995 || Siding Spring || G. J. Garradd || H || align=right data-sort-value="0.96" | 960 m || 
|-id=821 bgcolor=#E9E9E9
| 55821 ||  || — || May 4, 1995 || Kitt Peak || Spacewatch || — || align=right | 4.7 km || 
|-id=822 bgcolor=#E9E9E9
| 55822 || 1995 LV || — || June 4, 1995 || Kitt Peak || Spacewatch || — || align=right | 4.0 km || 
|-id=823 bgcolor=#d6d6d6
| 55823 ||  || — || July 22, 1995 || Kitt Peak || Spacewatch || TIR || align=right | 7.1 km || 
|-id=824 bgcolor=#d6d6d6
| 55824 ||  || — || August 19, 1995 || Xinglong || SCAP || — || align=right | 5.0 km || 
|-id=825 bgcolor=#fefefe
| 55825 ||  || — || September 27, 1995 || Church Stretton || S. P. Laurie || — || align=right | 1.8 km || 
|-id=826 bgcolor=#d6d6d6
| 55826 ||  || — || September 17, 1995 || Kitt Peak || Spacewatch || — || align=right | 5.1 km || 
|-id=827 bgcolor=#d6d6d6
| 55827 ||  || — || September 25, 1995 || Kitt Peak || Spacewatch || THM || align=right | 4.4 km || 
|-id=828 bgcolor=#d6d6d6
| 55828 ||  || — || October 16, 1995 || San Marcello || A. Boattini, L. Tesi || EOS || align=right | 6.7 km || 
|-id=829 bgcolor=#d6d6d6
| 55829 ||  || — || October 17, 1995 || Kitt Peak || Spacewatch || — || align=right | 3.1 km || 
|-id=830 bgcolor=#d6d6d6
| 55830 ||  || — || November 17, 1995 || Kitt Peak || Spacewatch || — || align=right | 6.3 km || 
|-id=831 bgcolor=#fefefe
| 55831 || 1995 XL || — || December 12, 1995 || Sudbury || D. di Cicco || — || align=right | 1.6 km || 
|-id=832 bgcolor=#fefefe
| 55832 ||  || — || April 13, 1996 || Xinglong || SCAP || PHO || align=right | 2.1 km || 
|-id=833 bgcolor=#fefefe
| 55833 ||  || — || April 15, 1996 || La Silla || E. W. Elst || — || align=right | 3.6 km || 
|-id=834 bgcolor=#fefefe
| 55834 ||  || — || April 15, 1996 || La Silla || E. W. Elst || NYS || align=right | 1.5 km || 
|-id=835 bgcolor=#fefefe
| 55835 ||  || — || April 17, 1996 || Kitt Peak || Spacewatch || — || align=right | 2.4 km || 
|-id=836 bgcolor=#fefefe
| 55836 ||  || — || April 20, 1996 || La Silla || E. W. Elst || NYS || align=right | 1.5 km || 
|-id=837 bgcolor=#fefefe
| 55837 ||  || — || May 15, 1996 || Xinglong || SCAP || — || align=right | 3.3 km || 
|-id=838 bgcolor=#fefefe
| 55838 Hagongda || 1996 LN ||  || June 7, 1996 || Xinglong || SCAP || — || align=right | 2.5 km || 
|-id=839 bgcolor=#E9E9E9
| 55839 ||  || — || June 13, 1996 || Church Stretton || S. P. Laurie || — || align=right | 4.1 km || 
|-id=840 bgcolor=#E9E9E9
| 55840 ||  || — || July 15, 1996 || Haleakala || NEAT || ADE || align=right | 7.7 km || 
|-id=841 bgcolor=#E9E9E9
| 55841 ||  || — || July 14, 1996 || La Silla || E. W. Elst || HEN || align=right | 3.0 km || 
|-id=842 bgcolor=#fefefe
| 55842 || 1996 PU || — || August 9, 1996 || Haleakala || NEAT || — || align=right | 3.5 km || 
|-id=843 bgcolor=#E9E9E9
| 55843 ||  || — || August 9, 1996 || Loomberah || G. J. Garradd || — || align=right | 3.9 km || 
|-id=844 bgcolor=#fefefe
| 55844 Bičák ||  ||  || September 12, 1996 || Catalina Station || C. W. Hergenrother || H || align=right | 2.6 km || 
|-id=845 bgcolor=#E9E9E9
| 55845 Marco ||  ||  || September 13, 1996 || Bologna || San Vittore Obs. || MAR || align=right | 2.1 km || 
|-id=846 bgcolor=#E9E9E9
| 55846 ||  || — || September 15, 1996 || Church Stretton || S. P. Laurie || — || align=right | 6.1 km || 
|-id=847 bgcolor=#d6d6d6
| 55847 || 1996 SQ || — || September 20, 1996 || Sudbury || D. di Cicco || — || align=right | 4.5 km || 
|-id=848 bgcolor=#E9E9E9
| 55848 ||  || — || September 18, 1996 || Xinglong || SCAP || — || align=right | 3.4 km || 
|-id=849 bgcolor=#E9E9E9
| 55849 ||  || — || October 3, 1996 || Xinglong || SCAP || — || align=right | 8.5 km || 
|-id=850 bgcolor=#d6d6d6
| 55850 ||  || — || October 6, 1996 || Kitt Peak || Spacewatch || — || align=right | 4.6 km || 
|-id=851 bgcolor=#E9E9E9
| 55851 ||  || — || October 8, 1996 || Kitt Peak || Spacewatch || — || align=right | 5.5 km || 
|-id=852 bgcolor=#d6d6d6
| 55852 ||  || — || October 10, 1996 || Kitt Peak || Spacewatch || KAR || align=right | 2.1 km || 
|-id=853 bgcolor=#E9E9E9
| 55853 ||  || — || October 5, 1996 || La Silla || E. W. Elst || EUN || align=right | 5.2 km || 
|-id=854 bgcolor=#fefefe
| 55854 Stoppani ||  ||  || November 8, 1996 || Sormano || M. Cavagna, P. Chiavenna || H || align=right | 2.9 km || 
|-id=855 bgcolor=#d6d6d6
| 55855 ||  || — || November 2, 1996 || Xinglong || SCAP || — || align=right | 6.7 km || 
|-id=856 bgcolor=#d6d6d6
| 55856 ||  || — || November 5, 1996 || Kitt Peak || Spacewatch || KOR || align=right | 2.8 km || 
|-id=857 bgcolor=#d6d6d6
| 55857 ||  || — || December 2, 1996 || Oizumi || T. Kobayashi || — || align=right | 6.7 km || 
|-id=858 bgcolor=#d6d6d6
| 55858 ||  || — || December 5, 1996 || Kitt Peak || Spacewatch || — || align=right | 5.1 km || 
|-id=859 bgcolor=#E9E9E9
| 55859 ||  || — || January 2, 1997 || Kitt Peak || Spacewatch || — || align=right | 4.2 km || 
|-id=860 bgcolor=#d6d6d6
| 55860 ||  || — || January 31, 1997 || Ondřejov || L. Kotková || THM || align=right | 5.6 km || 
|-id=861 bgcolor=#d6d6d6
| 55861 ||  || — || February 4, 1997 || Kitt Peak || Spacewatch || VER || align=right | 6.0 km || 
|-id=862 bgcolor=#fefefe
| 55862 ||  || — || February 6, 1997 || Xinglong || SCAP || FLO || align=right | 1.5 km || 
|-id=863 bgcolor=#fefefe
| 55863 ||  || — || July 31, 1997 || Caussols || ODAS || NYS || align=right | 3.9 km || 
|-id=864 bgcolor=#fefefe
| 55864 || 1997 PC || — || August 1, 1997 || Haleakala || NEAT || NYS || align=right | 2.2 km || 
|-id=865 bgcolor=#fefefe
| 55865 || 1997 PZ || — || August 3, 1997 || Xinglong || SCAP || — || align=right | 2.1 km || 
|-id=866 bgcolor=#fefefe
| 55866 ||  || — || August 11, 1997 || Mallorca || Á. López J., R. Pacheco || — || align=right | 1.9 km || 
|-id=867 bgcolor=#fefefe
| 55867 ||  || — || September 3, 1997 || Woomera || F. B. Zoltowski || V || align=right | 1.7 km || 
|-id=868 bgcolor=#fefefe
| 55868 ||  || — || September 28, 1997 || Kitt Peak || Spacewatch || MAS || align=right | 1.7 km || 
|-id=869 bgcolor=#fefefe
| 55869 ||  || — || October 3, 1997 || Caussols || ODAS || FLO || align=right | 1.9 km || 
|-id=870 bgcolor=#E9E9E9
| 55870 ||  || — || October 11, 1997 || Xinglong || SCAP || — || align=right | 5.4 km || 
|-id=871 bgcolor=#E9E9E9
| 55871 ||  || — || October 21, 1997 || Nachi-Katsuura || Y. Shimizu, T. Urata || — || align=right | 3.1 km || 
|-id=872 bgcolor=#E9E9E9
| 55872 ||  || — || October 21, 1997 || Kitt Peak || Spacewatch || — || align=right | 7.1 km || 
|-id=873 bgcolor=#E9E9E9
| 55873 Shiomidake ||  ||  || October 26, 1997 || Mishima || M. Akiyama || — || align=right | 3.7 km || 
|-id=874 bgcolor=#E9E9E9
| 55874 Brlka ||  ||  || October 28, 1997 || Ondřejov || P. Pravec || — || align=right | 4.0 km || 
|-id=875 bgcolor=#E9E9E9
| 55875 Hirohatagaoka || 1997 VH ||  || November 1, 1997 || Hadano Obs. || A. Asami || — || align=right | 3.8 km || 
|-id=876 bgcolor=#E9E9E9
| 55876 ||  || — || November 6, 1997 || Oizumi || T. Kobayashi || — || align=right | 4.2 km || 
|-id=877 bgcolor=#E9E9E9
| 55877 ||  || — || November 4, 1997 || Nachi-Katsuura || Y. Shimizu, T. Urata || — || align=right | 2.9 km || 
|-id=878 bgcolor=#fefefe
| 55878 ||  || — || November 3, 1997 || Xinglong || SCAP || — || align=right | 2.9 km || 
|-id=879 bgcolor=#E9E9E9
| 55879 || 1997 WG || — || November 18, 1997 || Oizumi || T. Kobayashi || — || align=right | 3.0 km || 
|-id=880 bgcolor=#E9E9E9
| 55880 || 1997 WS || — || November 18, 1997 || Prescott || P. G. Comba || — || align=right | 2.9 km || 
|-id=881 bgcolor=#fefefe
| 55881 ||  || — || November 19, 1997 || Oizumi || T. Kobayashi || — || align=right | 4.8 km || 
|-id=882 bgcolor=#fefefe
| 55882 ||  || — || November 20, 1997 || Woomera || F. B. Zoltowski || — || align=right | 2.9 km || 
|-id=883 bgcolor=#E9E9E9
| 55883 ||  || — || November 23, 1997 || Chichibu || N. Satō || RAF || align=right | 2.8 km || 
|-id=884 bgcolor=#E9E9E9
| 55884 ||  || — || November 21, 1997 || Kitt Peak || Spacewatch || — || align=right | 2.3 km || 
|-id=885 bgcolor=#E9E9E9
| 55885 ||  || — || November 23, 1997 || Kitt Peak || Spacewatch || — || align=right | 2.0 km || 
|-id=886 bgcolor=#E9E9E9
| 55886 ||  || — || November 29, 1997 || Socorro || LINEAR || EUN || align=right | 4.2 km || 
|-id=887 bgcolor=#E9E9E9
| 55887 ||  || — || November 29, 1997 || Socorro || LINEAR || — || align=right | 5.3 km || 
|-id=888 bgcolor=#E9E9E9
| 55888 ||  || — || November 29, 1997 || Socorro || LINEAR || — || align=right | 5.3 km || 
|-id=889 bgcolor=#E9E9E9
| 55889 ||  || — || November 29, 1997 || Socorro || LINEAR || — || align=right | 5.7 km || 
|-id=890 bgcolor=#fefefe
| 55890 ||  || — || November 29, 1997 || Socorro || LINEAR || — || align=right | 5.9 km || 
|-id=891 bgcolor=#E9E9E9
| 55891 ||  || — || December 3, 1997 || Caussols || ODAS || — || align=right | 2.9 km || 
|-id=892 bgcolor=#E9E9E9
| 55892 Fuzhougezhi ||  ||  || December 1, 1997 || Xinglong || SCAP || — || align=right | 4.5 km || 
|-id=893 bgcolor=#E9E9E9
| 55893 || 1997 YL || — || December 20, 1997 || Oizumi || T. Kobayashi || — || align=right | 4.1 km || 
|-id=894 bgcolor=#E9E9E9
| 55894 ||  || — || December 22, 1997 || Xinglong || SCAP || — || align=right | 3.3 km || 
|-id=895 bgcolor=#E9E9E9
| 55895 || 1998 AP || — || January 5, 1998 || Oizumi || T. Kobayashi || DOR || align=right | 7.8 km || 
|-id=896 bgcolor=#d6d6d6
| 55896 ||  || — || January 8, 1998 || Caussols || ODAS || — || align=right | 7.4 km || 
|-id=897 bgcolor=#d6d6d6
| 55897 ||  || — || January 8, 1998 || Caussols || ODAS || — || align=right | 6.5 km || 
|-id=898 bgcolor=#E9E9E9
| 55898 ||  || — || January 15, 1998 || Caussols || ODAS || — || align=right | 5.2 km || 
|-id=899 bgcolor=#E9E9E9
| 55899 ||  || — || January 24, 1998 || Woomera || F. B. Zoltowski || EUN || align=right | 3.8 km || 
|-id=900 bgcolor=#E9E9E9
| 55900 || 1998 CQ || — || February 3, 1998 || Modra || A. Galád, A. Pravda || — || align=right | 6.7 km || 
|}

55901–56000 

|-bgcolor=#E9E9E9
| 55901 Xuaoao ||  ||  || February 15, 1998 || Xinglong || SCAP || — || align=right | 3.0 km || 
|-id=902 bgcolor=#E9E9E9
| 55902 ||  || — || February 15, 1998 || Xinglong || SCAP || — || align=right | 5.0 km || 
|-id=903 bgcolor=#d6d6d6
| 55903 || 1998 DN || — || February 17, 1998 || Campo Catino || Campo Catino Obs. || — || align=right | 5.7 km || 
|-id=904 bgcolor=#d6d6d6
| 55904 ||  || — || February 20, 1998 || Kleť || Kleť Obs. || KOR || align=right | 3.0 km || 
|-id=905 bgcolor=#d6d6d6
| 55905 ||  || — || February 21, 1998 || Kleť || Kleť Obs. || — || align=right | 6.6 km || 
|-id=906 bgcolor=#d6d6d6
| 55906 ||  || — || February 28, 1998 || Prescott || P. G. Comba || — || align=right | 3.7 km || 
|-id=907 bgcolor=#d6d6d6
| 55907 ||  || — || February 23, 1998 || Kitt Peak || Spacewatch || ALA || align=right | 12 km || 
|-id=908 bgcolor=#d6d6d6
| 55908 ||  || — || March 1, 1998 || Kitt Peak || Spacewatch || KOR || align=right | 2.7 km || 
|-id=909 bgcolor=#d6d6d6
| 55909 ||  || — || March 1, 1998 || La Silla || E. W. Elst || — || align=right | 4.1 km || 
|-id=910 bgcolor=#d6d6d6
| 55910 ||  || — || March 1, 1998 || La Silla || E. W. Elst || — || align=right | 7.1 km || 
|-id=911 bgcolor=#E9E9E9
| 55911 ||  || — || March 1, 1998 || La Silla || E. W. Elst || HOF || align=right | 9.7 km || 
|-id=912 bgcolor=#d6d6d6
| 55912 ||  || — || March 22, 1998 || Kitt Peak || Spacewatch || — || align=right | 10 km || 
|-id=913 bgcolor=#fefefe
| 55913 ||  || — || March 26, 1998 || Caussols || ODAS || H || align=right | 2.4 km || 
|-id=914 bgcolor=#d6d6d6
| 55914 ||  || — || March 26, 1998 || Caussols || ODAS || — || align=right | 6.8 km || 
|-id=915 bgcolor=#E9E9E9
| 55915 ||  || — || March 20, 1998 || Socorro || LINEAR || — || align=right | 3.5 km || 
|-id=916 bgcolor=#d6d6d6
| 55916 ||  || — || March 20, 1998 || Socorro || LINEAR || — || align=right | 14 km || 
|-id=917 bgcolor=#d6d6d6
| 55917 ||  || — || March 20, 1998 || Socorro || LINEAR || — || align=right | 5.0 km || 
|-id=918 bgcolor=#d6d6d6
| 55918 ||  || — || March 20, 1998 || Socorro || LINEAR || DUR || align=right | 8.0 km || 
|-id=919 bgcolor=#d6d6d6
| 55919 ||  || — || March 20, 1998 || Socorro || LINEAR || EOS || align=right | 6.5 km || 
|-id=920 bgcolor=#d6d6d6
| 55920 ||  || — || March 20, 1998 || Socorro || LINEAR || — || align=right | 4.1 km || 
|-id=921 bgcolor=#d6d6d6
| 55921 ||  || — || March 20, 1998 || Socorro || LINEAR || EOS || align=right | 4.2 km || 
|-id=922 bgcolor=#d6d6d6
| 55922 ||  || — || March 20, 1998 || Socorro || LINEAR || THM || align=right | 8.2 km || 
|-id=923 bgcolor=#d6d6d6
| 55923 ||  || — || March 20, 1998 || Socorro || LINEAR || TEL || align=right | 4.2 km || 
|-id=924 bgcolor=#d6d6d6
| 55924 ||  || — || March 20, 1998 || Socorro || LINEAR || — || align=right | 5.0 km || 
|-id=925 bgcolor=#d6d6d6
| 55925 ||  || — || March 20, 1998 || Socorro || LINEAR || TEL || align=right | 4.4 km || 
|-id=926 bgcolor=#d6d6d6
| 55926 ||  || — || March 20, 1998 || Socorro || LINEAR || — || align=right | 10 km || 
|-id=927 bgcolor=#d6d6d6
| 55927 ||  || — || March 20, 1998 || Socorro || LINEAR || EOS || align=right | 5.0 km || 
|-id=928 bgcolor=#d6d6d6
| 55928 ||  || — || March 20, 1998 || Socorro || LINEAR || EMA || align=right | 7.6 km || 
|-id=929 bgcolor=#d6d6d6
| 55929 ||  || — || March 20, 1998 || Socorro || LINEAR || — || align=right | 11 km || 
|-id=930 bgcolor=#d6d6d6
| 55930 ||  || — || March 20, 1998 || Socorro || LINEAR || BRA || align=right | 5.4 km || 
|-id=931 bgcolor=#d6d6d6
| 55931 ||  || — || March 20, 1998 || Socorro || LINEAR || EOS || align=right | 5.3 km || 
|-id=932 bgcolor=#d6d6d6
| 55932 ||  || — || March 20, 1998 || Socorro || LINEAR || — || align=right | 5.7 km || 
|-id=933 bgcolor=#d6d6d6
| 55933 ||  || — || March 30, 1998 || Ondřejov || P. Pravec, M. Wolf || — || align=right | 5.7 km || 
|-id=934 bgcolor=#fefefe
| 55934 ||  || — || March 28, 1998 || Socorro || LINEAR || H || align=right | 1.4 km || 
|-id=935 bgcolor=#E9E9E9
| 55935 ||  || — || March 24, 1998 || Bergisch Gladbach || W. Bickel || GEF || align=right | 3.6 km || 
|-id=936 bgcolor=#d6d6d6
| 55936 ||  || — || March 24, 1998 || Socorro || LINEAR || HYG || align=right | 7.8 km || 
|-id=937 bgcolor=#d6d6d6
| 55937 ||  || — || March 31, 1998 || Socorro || LINEAR || EOS || align=right | 6.3 km || 
|-id=938 bgcolor=#d6d6d6
| 55938 ||  || — || March 31, 1998 || Socorro || LINEAR || — || align=right | 5.6 km || 
|-id=939 bgcolor=#d6d6d6
| 55939 ||  || — || March 31, 1998 || Socorro || LINEAR || — || align=right | 5.3 km || 
|-id=940 bgcolor=#d6d6d6
| 55940 ||  || — || April 2, 1998 || Socorro || LINEAR || EUP || align=right | 13 km || 
|-id=941 bgcolor=#d6d6d6
| 55941 ||  || — || April 23, 1998 || Kleť || Kleť Obs. || — || align=right | 3.6 km || 
|-id=942 bgcolor=#d6d6d6
| 55942 ||  || — || April 19, 1998 || Kitt Peak || Spacewatch || — || align=right | 5.0 km || 
|-id=943 bgcolor=#d6d6d6
| 55943 ||  || — || April 20, 1998 || Kitt Peak || Spacewatch || — || align=right | 11 km || 
|-id=944 bgcolor=#d6d6d6
| 55944 ||  || — || April 18, 1998 || Socorro || LINEAR || EOS || align=right | 4.4 km || 
|-id=945 bgcolor=#d6d6d6
| 55945 ||  || — || April 20, 1998 || Socorro || LINEAR || — || align=right | 13 km || 
|-id=946 bgcolor=#d6d6d6
| 55946 ||  || — || April 22, 1998 || Višnjan Observatory || Višnjan Obs. || — || align=right | 16 km || 
|-id=947 bgcolor=#d6d6d6
| 55947 ||  || — || April 23, 1998 || Haleakala || NEAT || — || align=right | 11 km || 
|-id=948 bgcolor=#d6d6d6
| 55948 ||  || — || April 20, 1998 || Socorro || LINEAR || — || align=right | 7.3 km || 
|-id=949 bgcolor=#d6d6d6
| 55949 ||  || — || April 20, 1998 || Socorro || LINEAR || THM || align=right | 7.0 km || 
|-id=950 bgcolor=#d6d6d6
| 55950 ||  || — || April 21, 1998 || Socorro || LINEAR || THM || align=right | 5.4 km || 
|-id=951 bgcolor=#d6d6d6
| 55951 ||  || — || April 21, 1998 || Socorro || LINEAR || THM || align=right | 6.6 km || 
|-id=952 bgcolor=#d6d6d6
| 55952 ||  || — || April 21, 1998 || Socorro || LINEAR || — || align=right | 6.2 km || 
|-id=953 bgcolor=#d6d6d6
| 55953 ||  || — || April 21, 1998 || Socorro || LINEAR || HYG || align=right | 5.3 km || 
|-id=954 bgcolor=#E9E9E9
| 55954 ||  || — || April 21, 1998 || Socorro || LINEAR || — || align=right | 6.7 km || 
|-id=955 bgcolor=#d6d6d6
| 55955 ||  || — || April 21, 1998 || Socorro || LINEAR || THM || align=right | 7.6 km || 
|-id=956 bgcolor=#d6d6d6
| 55956 ||  || — || April 21, 1998 || Socorro || LINEAR || — || align=right | 16 km || 
|-id=957 bgcolor=#d6d6d6
| 55957 ||  || — || April 21, 1998 || Socorro || LINEAR || — || align=right | 7.6 km || 
|-id=958 bgcolor=#d6d6d6
| 55958 ||  || — || April 23, 1998 || Socorro || LINEAR || EUP || align=right | 8.4 km || 
|-id=959 bgcolor=#d6d6d6
| 55959 ||  || — || April 23, 1998 || Socorro || LINEAR || ALA || align=right | 8.3 km || 
|-id=960 bgcolor=#d6d6d6
| 55960 ||  || — || April 19, 1998 || Socorro || LINEAR || — || align=right | 10 km || 
|-id=961 bgcolor=#d6d6d6
| 55961 ||  || — || April 21, 1998 || Socorro || LINEAR || URS || align=right | 12 km || 
|-id=962 bgcolor=#d6d6d6
| 55962 ||  || — || April 19, 1998 || Socorro || LINEAR || TIR || align=right | 5.2 km || 
|-id=963 bgcolor=#d6d6d6
| 55963 ||  || — || April 22, 1998 || Socorro || LINEAR || HYG || align=right | 6.5 km || 
|-id=964 bgcolor=#fefefe
| 55964 ||  || — || May 22, 1998 || Socorro || LINEAR || H || align=right | 1.7 km || 
|-id=965 bgcolor=#d6d6d6
| 55965 ||  || — || May 22, 1998 || Socorro || LINEAR || — || align=right | 5.7 km || 
|-id=966 bgcolor=#d6d6d6
| 55966 ||  || — || May 22, 1998 || Socorro || LINEAR || — || align=right | 5.9 km || 
|-id=967 bgcolor=#d6d6d6
| 55967 ||  || — || May 22, 1998 || Socorro || LINEAR || URS || align=right | 9.2 km || 
|-id=968 bgcolor=#d6d6d6
| 55968 ||  || — || May 23, 1998 || Socorro || LINEAR || ALA || align=right | 11 km || 
|-id=969 bgcolor=#FA8072
| 55969 ||  || — || May 27, 1998 || Socorro || LINEAR || H || align=right | 1.8 km || 
|-id=970 bgcolor=#fefefe
| 55970 ||  || — || July 2, 1998 || Anderson Mesa || LONEOS || — || align=right | 2.0 km || 
|-id=971 bgcolor=#fefefe
| 55971 ||  || — || July 26, 1998 || La Silla || E. W. Elst || — || align=right | 1.6 km || 
|-id=972 bgcolor=#fefefe
| 55972 ||  || — || August 17, 1998 || Socorro || LINEAR || — || align=right | 1.6 km || 
|-id=973 bgcolor=#fefefe
| 55973 ||  || — || August 17, 1998 || Socorro || LINEAR || FLO || align=right | 1.8 km || 
|-id=974 bgcolor=#d6d6d6
| 55974 ||  || — || August 24, 1998 || Socorro || LINEAR || — || align=right | 8.2 km || 
|-id=975 bgcolor=#fefefe
| 55975 ||  || — || August 17, 1998 || Socorro || LINEAR || — || align=right | 2.1 km || 
|-id=976 bgcolor=#fefefe
| 55976 ||  || — || September 15, 1998 || Reedy Creek || J. Broughton || — || align=right | 2.0 km || 
|-id=977 bgcolor=#fefefe
| 55977 ||  || — || September 14, 1998 || Socorro || LINEAR || MAS || align=right | 1.6 km || 
|-id=978 bgcolor=#fefefe
| 55978 ||  || — || September 14, 1998 || Socorro || LINEAR || — || align=right | 2.0 km || 
|-id=979 bgcolor=#fefefe
| 55979 ||  || — || September 14, 1998 || Socorro || LINEAR || FLO || align=right | 2.6 km || 
|-id=980 bgcolor=#fefefe
| 55980 ||  || — || September 14, 1998 || Socorro || LINEAR || FLO || align=right | 2.4 km || 
|-id=981 bgcolor=#fefefe
| 55981 ||  || — || September 14, 1998 || Socorro || LINEAR || — || align=right | 1.5 km || 
|-id=982 bgcolor=#fefefe
| 55982 ||  || — || September 14, 1998 || Socorro || LINEAR || — || align=right | 2.1 km || 
|-id=983 bgcolor=#fefefe
| 55983 ||  || — || September 14, 1998 || Socorro || LINEAR || — || align=right | 1.6 km || 
|-id=984 bgcolor=#fefefe
| 55984 ||  || — || September 14, 1998 || Socorro || LINEAR || — || align=right | 1.9 km || 
|-id=985 bgcolor=#fefefe
| 55985 ||  || — || September 14, 1998 || Socorro || LINEAR || — || align=right | 1.7 km || 
|-id=986 bgcolor=#fefefe
| 55986 ||  || — || September 17, 1998 || Anderson Mesa || LONEOS || FLO || align=right | 1.9 km || 
|-id=987 bgcolor=#fefefe
| 55987 ||  || — || September 24, 1998 || Catalina || CSS || — || align=right | 3.1 km || 
|-id=988 bgcolor=#fefefe
| 55988 ||  || — || September 25, 1998 || Kitt Peak || Spacewatch || FLO || align=right | 1.5 km || 
|-id=989 bgcolor=#fefefe
| 55989 ||  || — || September 18, 1998 || Anderson Mesa || LONEOS || V || align=right | 2.2 km || 
|-id=990 bgcolor=#fefefe
| 55990 ||  || — || September 21, 1998 || La Silla || E. W. Elst || — || align=right | 1.5 km || 
|-id=991 bgcolor=#d6d6d6
| 55991 ||  || — || September 26, 1998 || Socorro || LINEAR || — || align=right | 7.5 km || 
|-id=992 bgcolor=#E9E9E9
| 55992 ||  || — || September 26, 1998 || Socorro || LINEAR || — || align=right | 5.5 km || 
|-id=993 bgcolor=#fefefe
| 55993 ||  || — || September 26, 1998 || Socorro || LINEAR || — || align=right | 1.8 km || 
|-id=994 bgcolor=#d6d6d6
| 55994 ||  || — || September 26, 1998 || Socorro || LINEAR || — || align=right | 6.9 km || 
|-id=995 bgcolor=#fefefe
| 55995 ||  || — || September 26, 1998 || Socorro || LINEAR || — || align=right | 1.6 km || 
|-id=996 bgcolor=#fefefe
| 55996 ||  || — || September 26, 1998 || Socorro || LINEAR || — || align=right | 2.1 km || 
|-id=997 bgcolor=#E9E9E9
| 55997 ||  || — || September 26, 1998 || Socorro || LINEAR || — || align=right | 3.3 km || 
|-id=998 bgcolor=#fefefe
| 55998 ||  || — || September 26, 1998 || Socorro || LINEAR || — || align=right | 2.0 km || 
|-id=999 bgcolor=#fefefe
| 55999 ||  || — || September 18, 1998 || La Silla || E. W. Elst || FLO || align=right | 4.1 km || 
|-id=000 bgcolor=#fefefe
| 56000 Mesopotamia ||  ||  || September 20, 1998 || La Silla || E. W. Elst || — || align=right | 2.3 km || 
|}

References

External links 
 Discovery Circumstances: Numbered Minor Planets (55001)–(60000) (IAU Minor Planet Center)

0055